= Igbo culture =

Cultural traditions of the Igbo people

Igbo culture (Igbo: Ọmenala Ndị Igbo) also called Odinala Ndị Igbo are the customs, practices and traditions of the Igbo people of southeastern Nigeria. It consists of ancient practices known as "Omenala" as well as new concepts added into the Igbo culture either by cultural evolution or by outside influence. These customs and traditions include the Igbo people's visual art, music, dance forms, attire, food, cuisine and language dialects. Because of their various subgroups, the variety of their culture is heightened further.

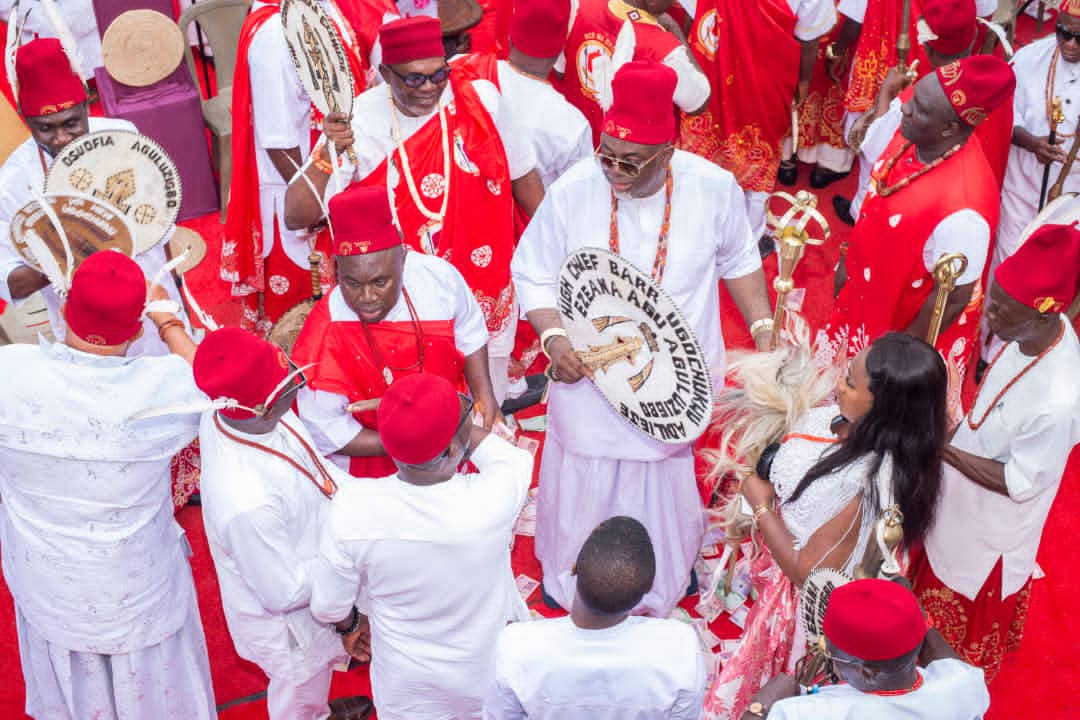
Igbo Red Cap Chiefs at an Igbo Cultural Ceremony

== Music ==
The Igbo people have a melodic and symphonic musical style. Instruments include Ọ̀pì, otherwise known as Oja, a wind instrument similar to the flute, igba, and ichaka.

A popular musical form among Igbo people is highlife, which is a fusion of jazz and traditional music and widely popular in West Africa.The modern Igbo highlife is seen in the works of Prince Nico Mbarga, Dr Sir Warrior, Oliver De Coque, Bright Chimezie, Celestine Ukwu, and Chief Osita Osadebe, who are considered to be some of the greatest Igbo highlife musicians of the twentieth century. Other notable Igbo highlife artists include Mike Ejeagha, Paulson Kalu, Ali Chukwuma, and Ozoemena Nwa Nsugbe.

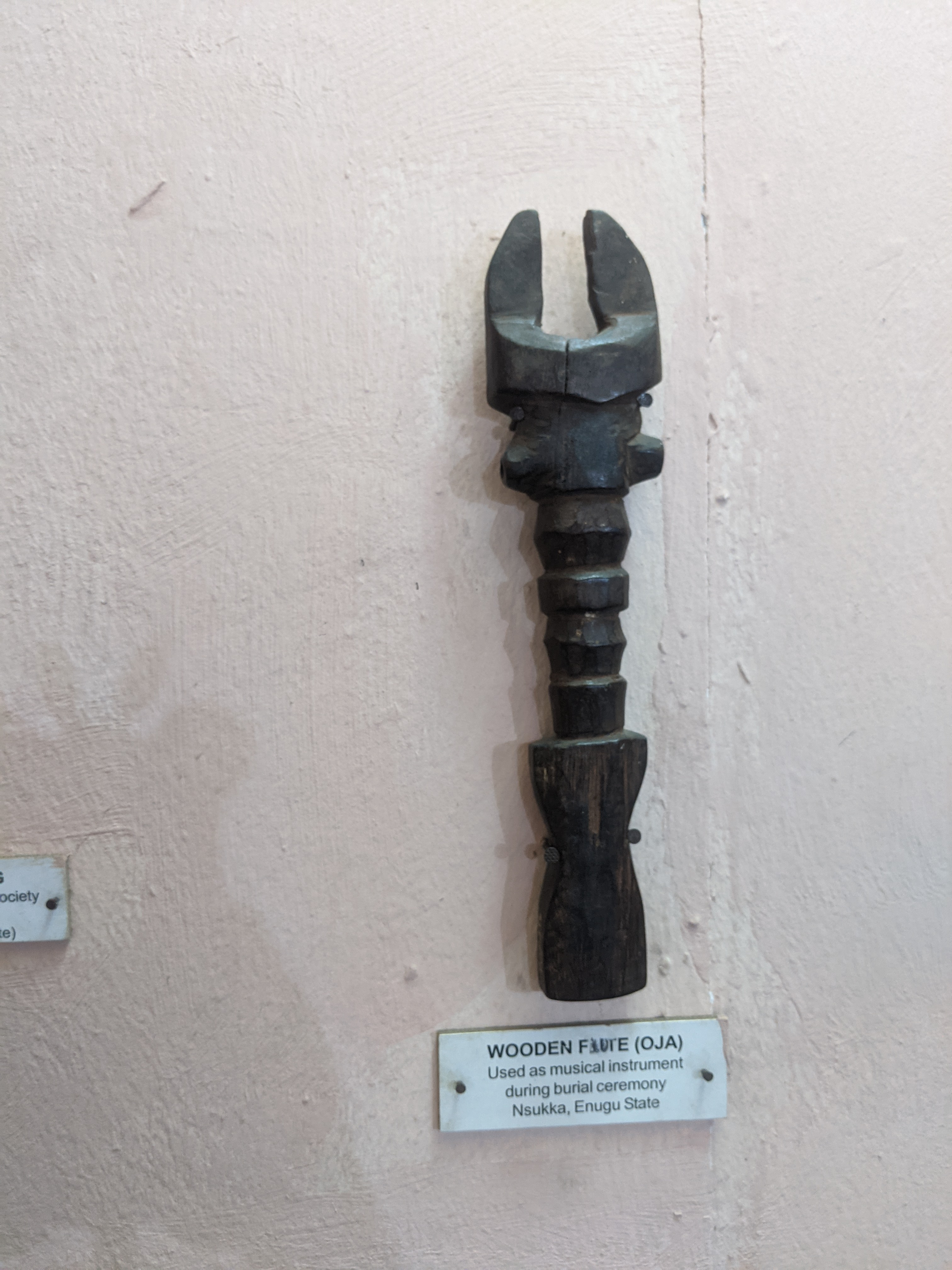
Oja, a traditional Igbo wooden flute used in ceremonies and cultural performances, southeastern Nigeria

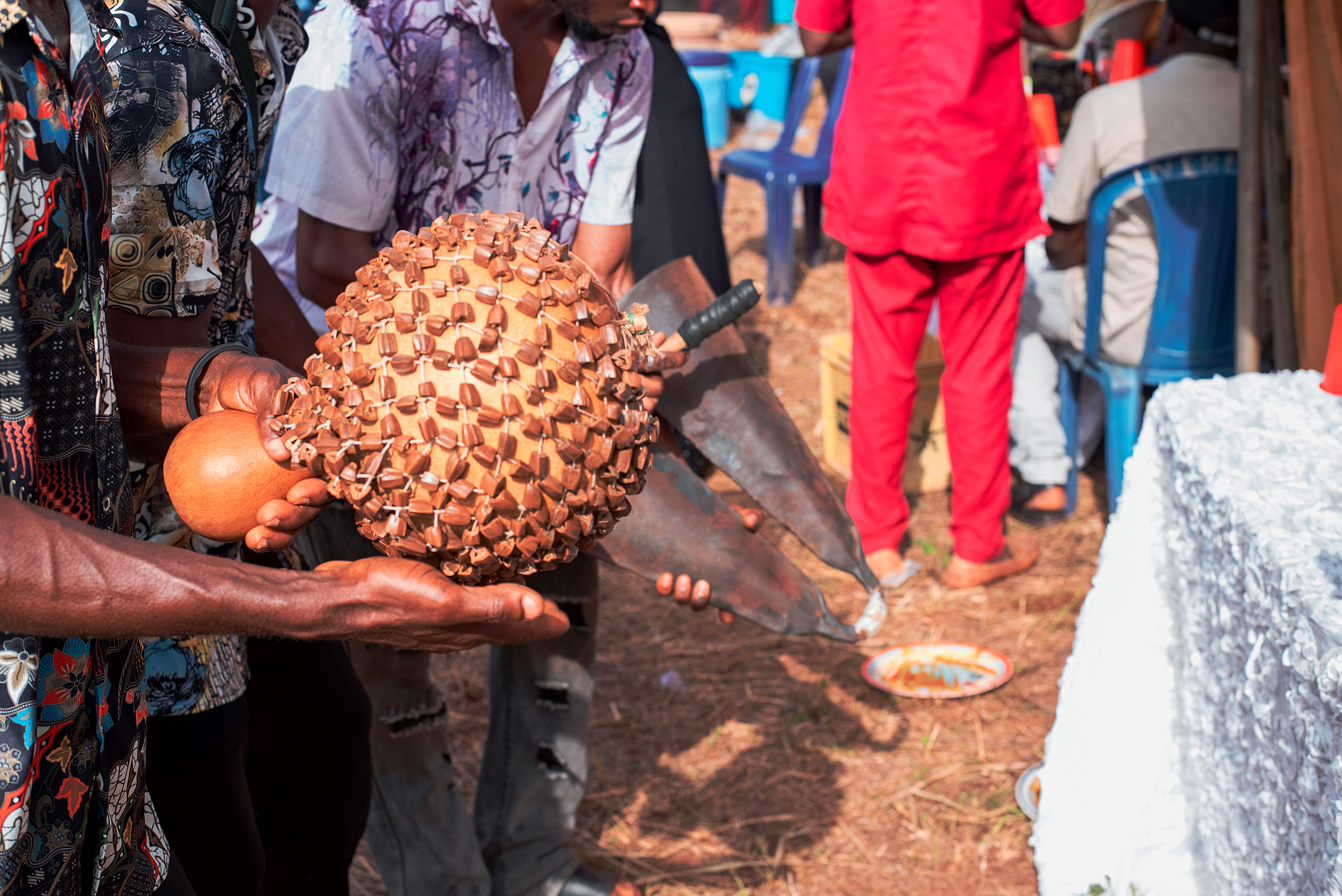
Ichaka, a traditional Igbo percussion instrument used in ceremonies and cultural performances, southeastern Nigeria

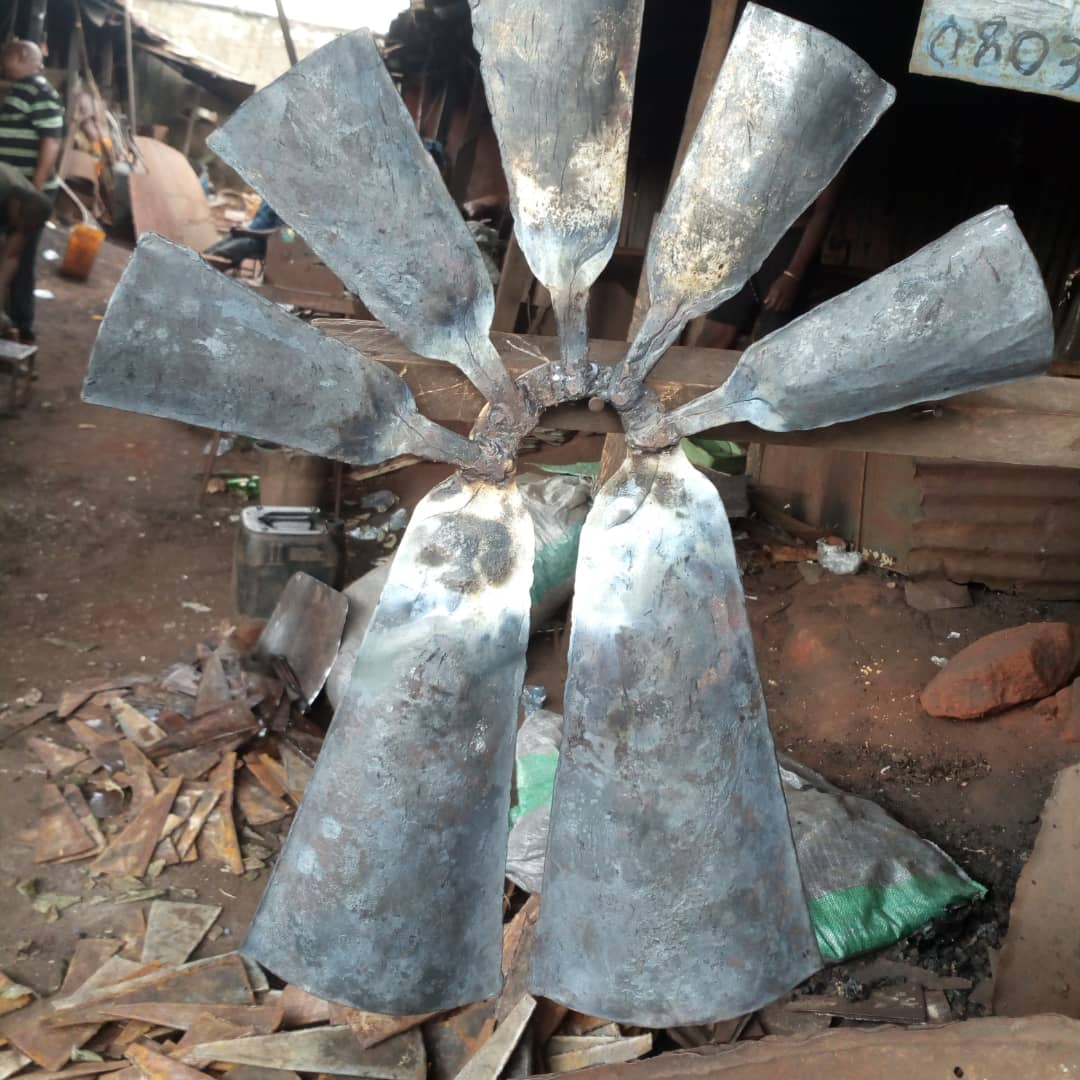
Ogene mkpi na asaa, a traditional Igbo metal gong used in ceremonies, masquerade performances and cultural gatherings, southeastern Nigeria

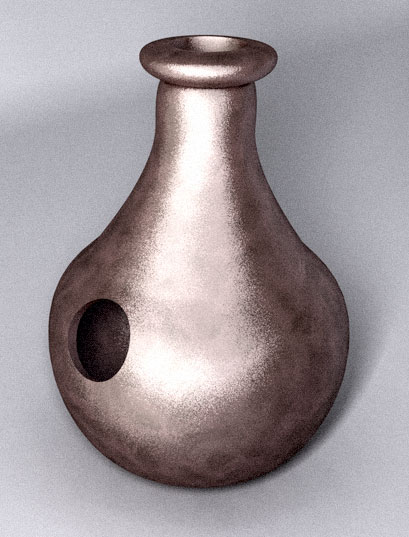
Udu, an Igbo instrument

== Art ==
Igbo art is known for various types of masquerades, masks, outfits (symbolizing people), animals, and abstract conceptions. Igbo art is also known for its bronze castings found in the town of Igbo Ukwu from the 9th century.

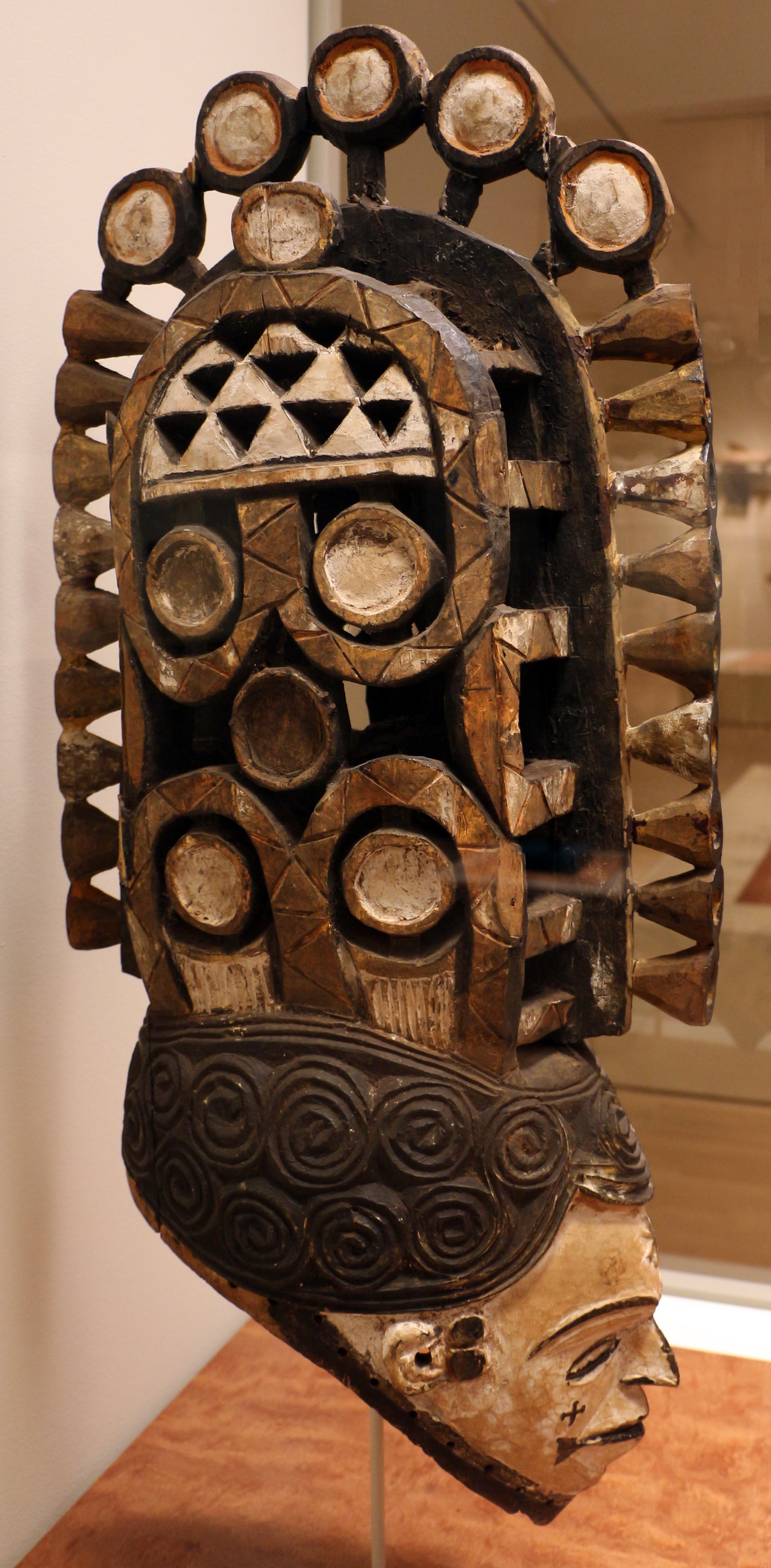
Helmet-mask; 20th century; Indianapolis Museum of Art (USA)

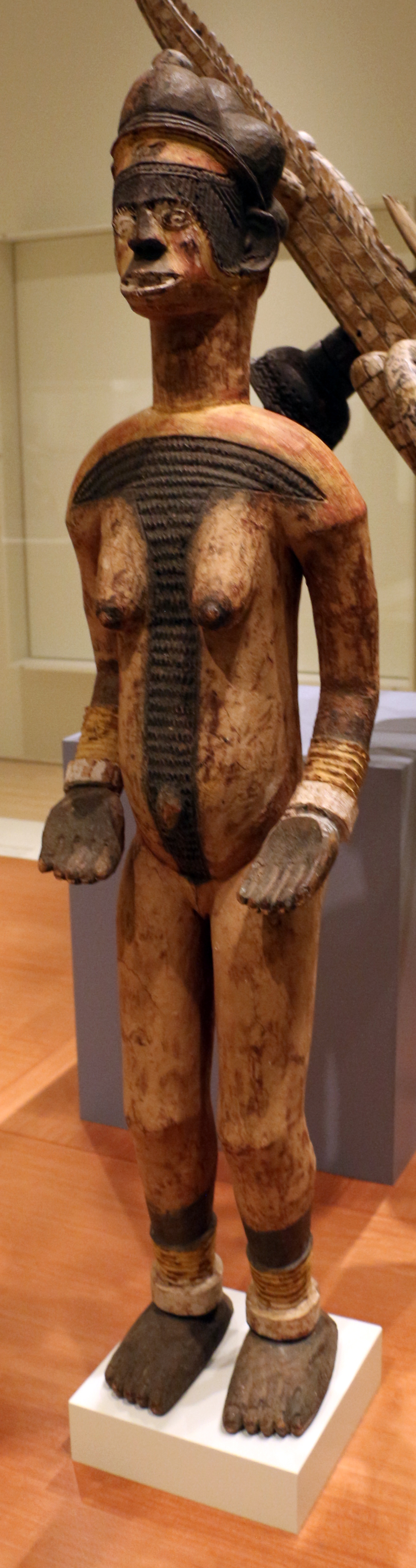
Female figure for a small temple, 20th century; Indianapolis Museum of Art

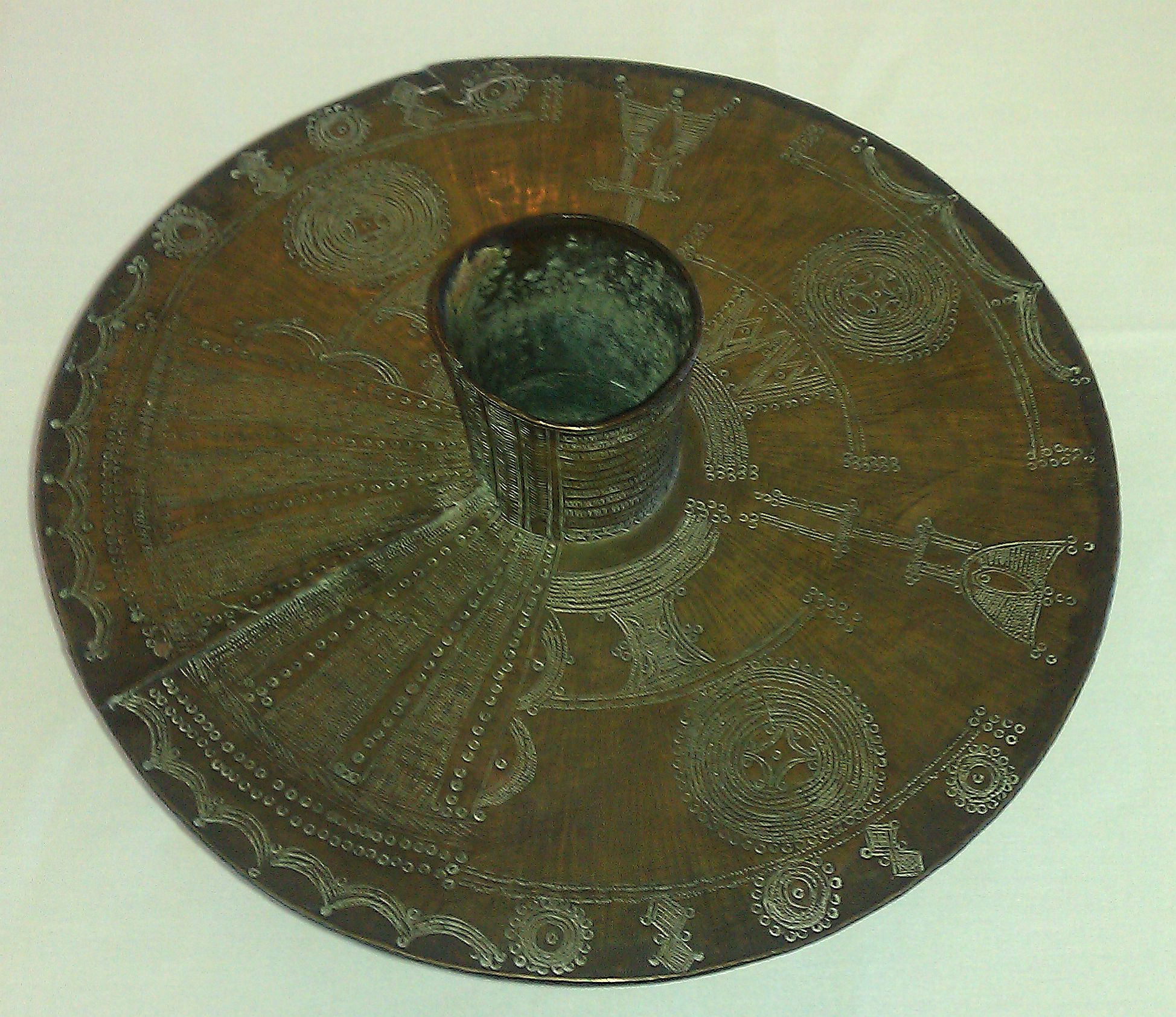
Anklet beaten from a solid brass bar of the type worn by Igbo women. Now in the collection of Wolverhampton Art Gallery. The leg-tube extends approximately 7 cm each side of the 35 cm disc.

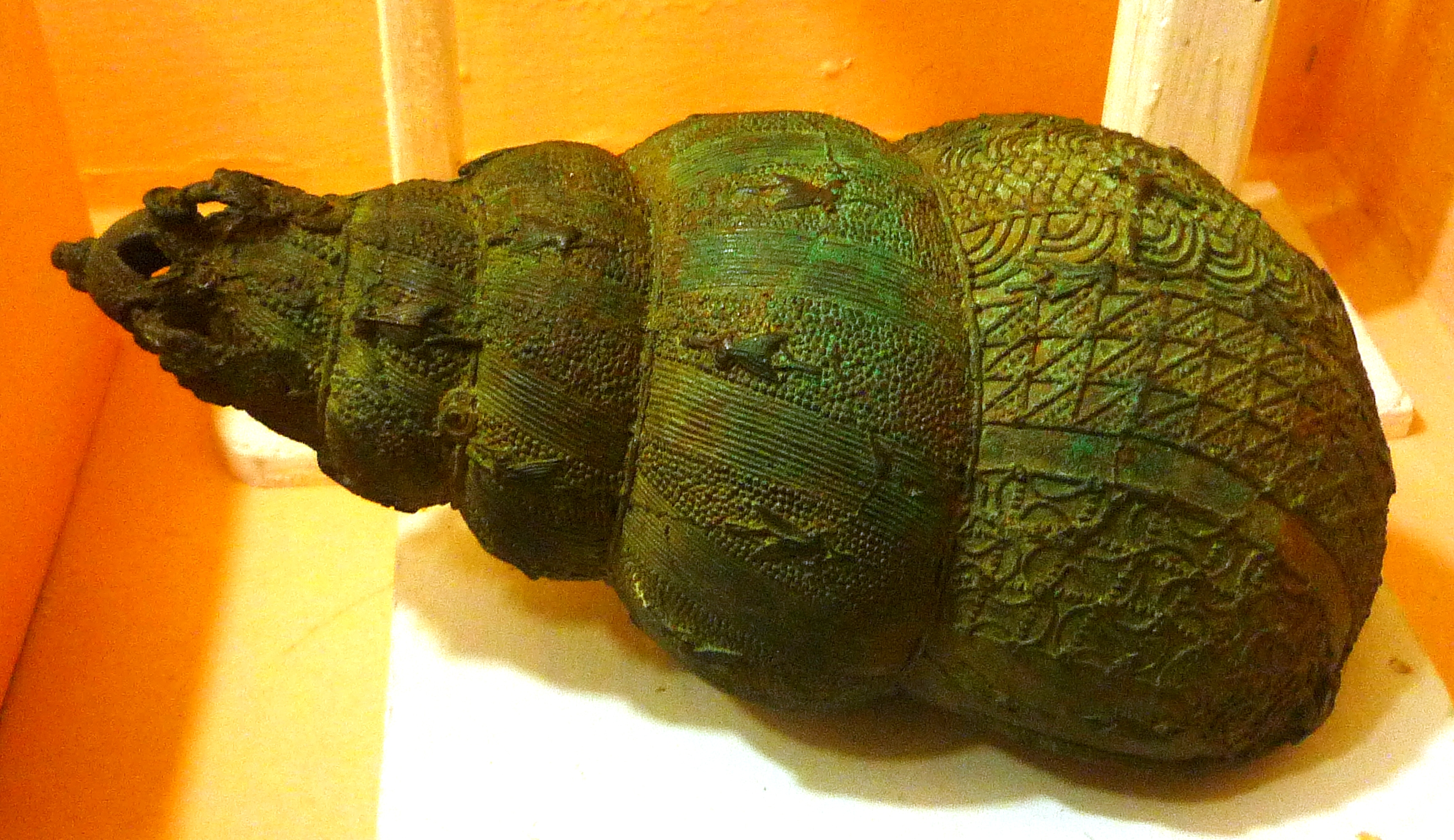
Bronze ceremonial vessel in form of a snail shell; 9th century; from Igbo-Ukwu; Nigerian National Museum (Lagos, Nigeria)

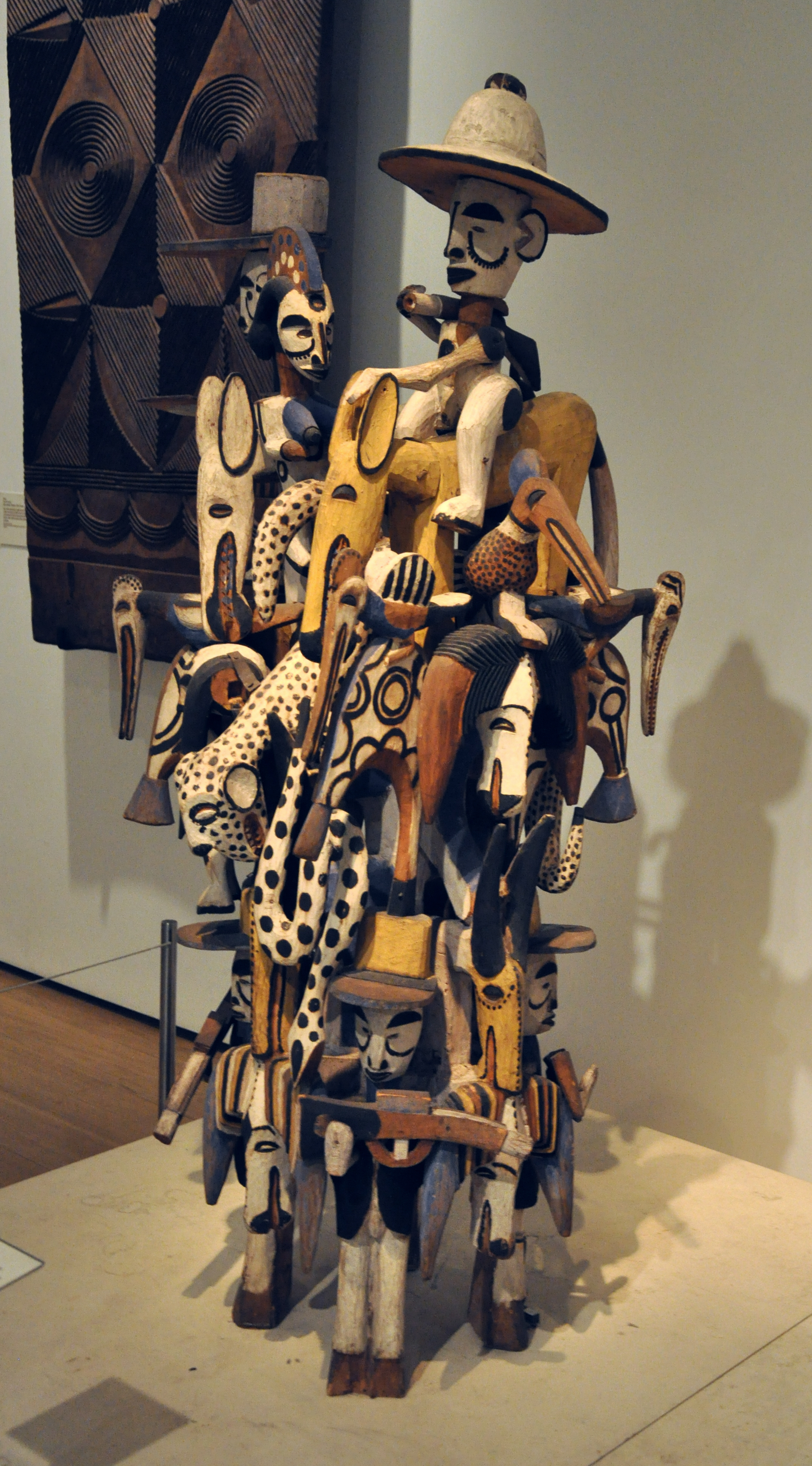
Complex wooden carving depicting images of power and daily life, such as horsemen, imported goods, military insignia, Europeans, rifles, wild beasts and masqueraders.

== Mythology ==
While today many Igbo people are Christian, the traditional ancient Igbo religion is known as Odinani. In the Igbo mythology, which is part of their ancient religion, the supreme God is called Chineke ("the God of creation"); Chineke created the world and everything in it and is associated with all things on Earth. To the ancient Igbo, the cosmos is divided into four complex parts:

- OKIKE (Creation)
- ALUSI (Supernatural Forces or Deities)
- MMUO (Spirit)
- UWA (World)

=== Alusi ===
Alusi, also known as Arusi or Arushi, are minor deities that are worshiped and served in Igbo mythology. There are a list of many different Alusi that exists within each community and each has its own purpose. When there is no longer need for the deity, it is returned to its source, through the help of a Chief Priest or Dibia, who is aware of the procedure and ensures that its done properly.

=== Mmuo ===
Mmuo simply means spirit. It is either a good and godly spirit (mmuo oma) or it is an evil spirit (mmuo ojo). For example, the Ogbanje spirit is seen as an evil spirit (mmuo ojo) and anyone possessed by this spirit is given spiritual attention. (Spiritual attention means a way of casting out the evil spirit through deliverance (Christian way) or through African Traditional Religion (i.e. digging out his/her “iyi uwa”. the ATR way)). Ogbanje is an Igbo (Nigeria) term that means a repeater or someone who comes and departs. Ogbanje is not a bad spirit in Igbo Cosmology. It is a word widely used to describe a kid or teenager who is claimed to die and be born repeatedly by the same person.

== Yam ==
The yam is the staple crop of the Igbo. There are celebrations such as the New yam festival (Igbo: Iri Ji) which are held Every August of Every year for the harvesting of the yam.

The New Yam festival (Igbo: Iri ji) is celebrated annually to secure a good harvest of the staple crop. The festival is practiced primarily in Nigeria and other countries in West Africa.

== Traditional marriage ==
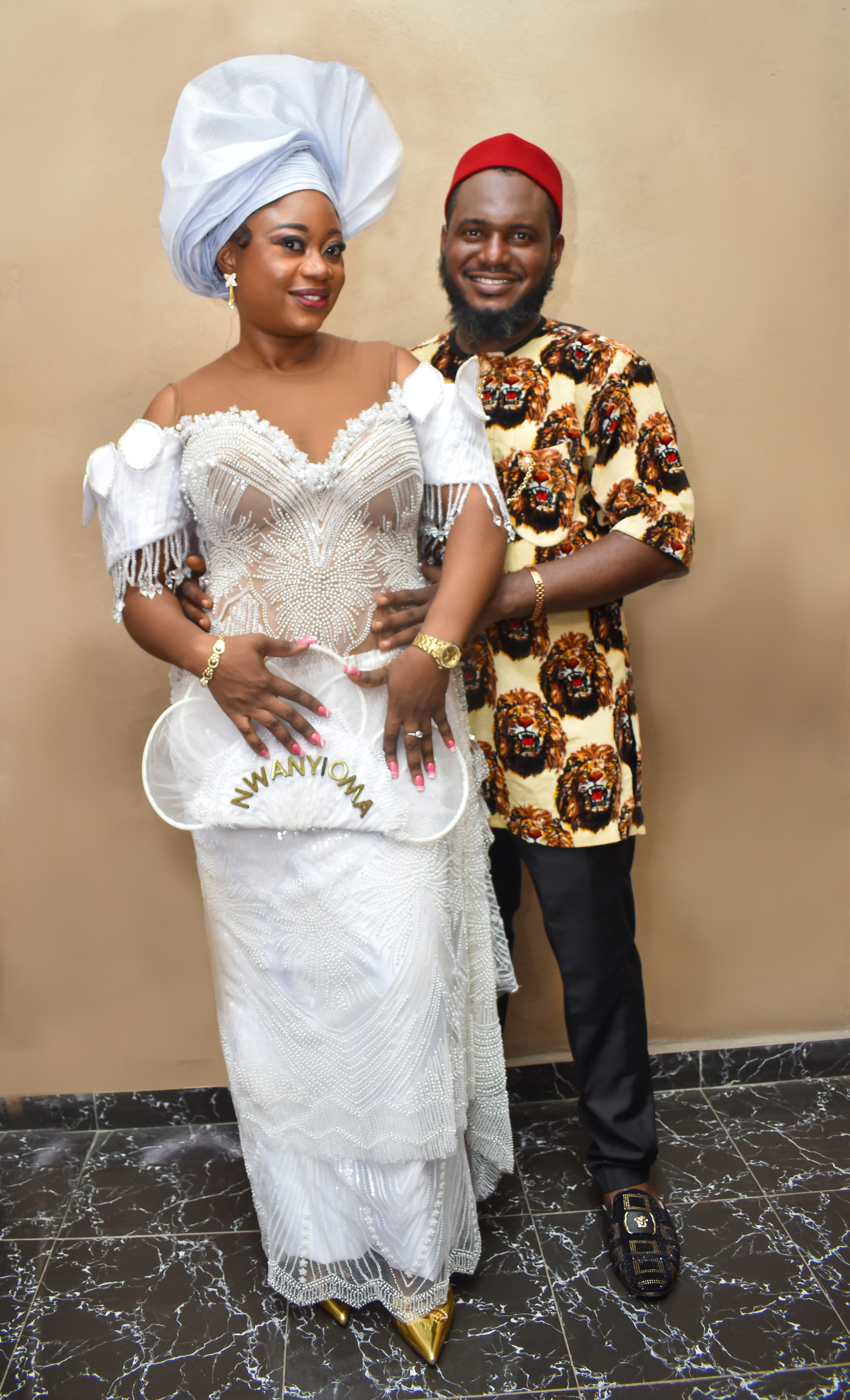
Traditional Igbo Marriage Attire

Marriages in Igbo community follow a multi-step process before the bride and groom are proclaimed husband and wife in accordance with local law and tradition.

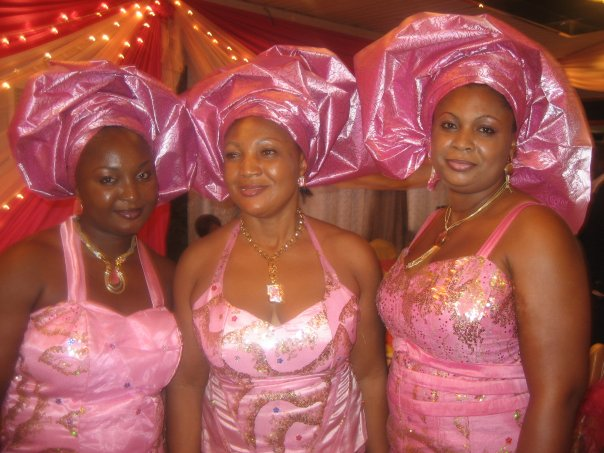
Igbo women of the umuagbo (bridal train) from Nnewi dressed in akwa ogbo (group uniform attire) during a traditional Igbo wedding ceremony.

The traditional marriage is known as "Igbankwu Alumdi" in Igbo land, or wine carrying, since it involves the bride serving up a cup of palm wine to her fiancé. Prior to the wedding, the groom must go to the bride's compound with his father before the Igbankwu day to get the bride's father's consent to marry his daughter. If the bride's father is late, in this case, the bride's brother, uncle or male relative fills in for the bride's late father, as applies to the groom. On the second visit, when kola nuts (oji Igbo) are offered, the two fathers must arrange a price for the bride. In most cases, the bride's price is just symbolic, in addition to other requirements like kola nuts, goats, wine, fowl and so on. Normally, it takes more than one evening until the bride price is agreed upon, after which a feast is served to both parents. When the bride price is paid, another evening is set aside for the ceremony.

During the ceremony, the bride's father fills a cup with palm wine and hands it over to the daughter. Accompanied by her bridesmaids, known as umuagbo nwunye, she then searches for the groom among the crowd of wedding guests to offer him the drink. Once the drink is offered, the bride and groom dance to the bride's father. They kneel before him and he will give them his blessings. After that, the couple dances for a while before taking their seats, then refreshment takes place followed by presentation of gifts, at times a speech from the MC, and then closing prayer and departure.

== Igbo Architecture ==
Igbo architecture refers to the architectural styles and building traditions of the Igbo people. The architectural style is closely tied to the Igbo society's culture, beliefs, and social structure. While the architectural style has evolved, traditional Igbo architecture shares some common characteristics such as:

Compound layout- Igbo architectural traditions often revolve around the concept of a compound which is characterized by an enclosed area encompassing multiple family residences, open central courtyards, verandas, and auxiliary structures. These compounds are meticulously planned and sometimes paved with flat stones to foster communal living and facilitate familial engagements. Additionally, certain compounds feature unique elements like Impluvium houses, Gardens, Moats, and water wells demonstrating the diversity within Igbo architectural practices.

Ventilation - Igbo architecture integrates strategic placement of openings in buildings to promote cross-ventilation, aiding in regulating indoor temperatures. Employing expansive openings facilitates air circulation, ensuring occupant comfort. Depending on the area with high temperatures and humidity, evaporation of sweat becomes challenging; however, airflow aids this process, enhancing comfort. Moreover, construction practices involve thick walls, thatched roofs, and raised foundations to mitigate environmental challenges. The thick walls maintain cooler interiors in hot weather and warmth during rainy seasons. Thatched roofs provide insulation from direct sunlight, offering shade and contributing to thermal comfort.

Shrines and Sacred Spaces- Igbo architecture often includes designated spaces in compounds or community areas for ancestral shrines/temples and secret society meeting houses. These spaces are considered sacred and are an essential part of Igbo cultural and religious practices. These sacred structures may vary in design, ranging from simple open-air spaces to more elaborate structures with specific architectural features.

Decorative Elements - Traditional Igbo architecture often incorporates decorative elements, including painted designs on walls such as uli, carved wooden door frames, and intricate patterns on ceilings. These decorations may have symbolic or religious significance.

== Traditional attire ==
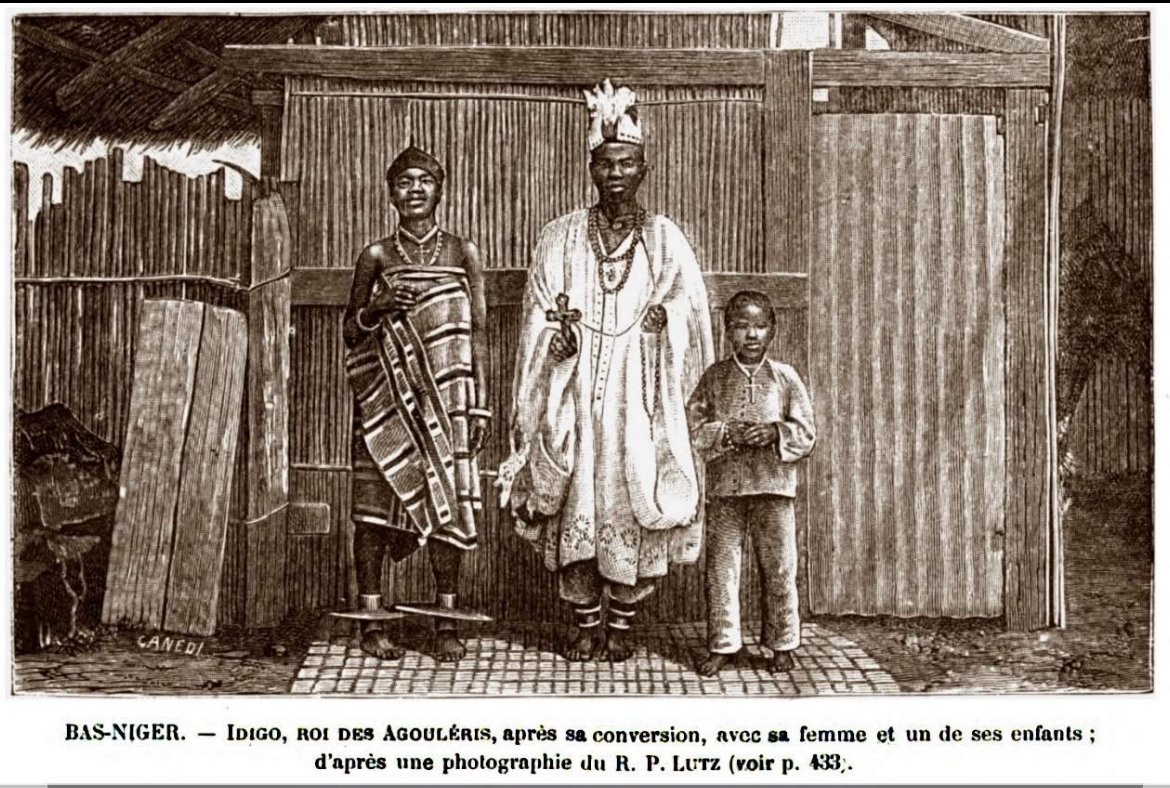
An Igbo king in akwa ogodo (royal ceremonial cloth), southeastern Nigeria, 1890s

Igbo traditional attire varies across regions of Southeastern and south south Nigeria with various cultural significance.

=== Men ===
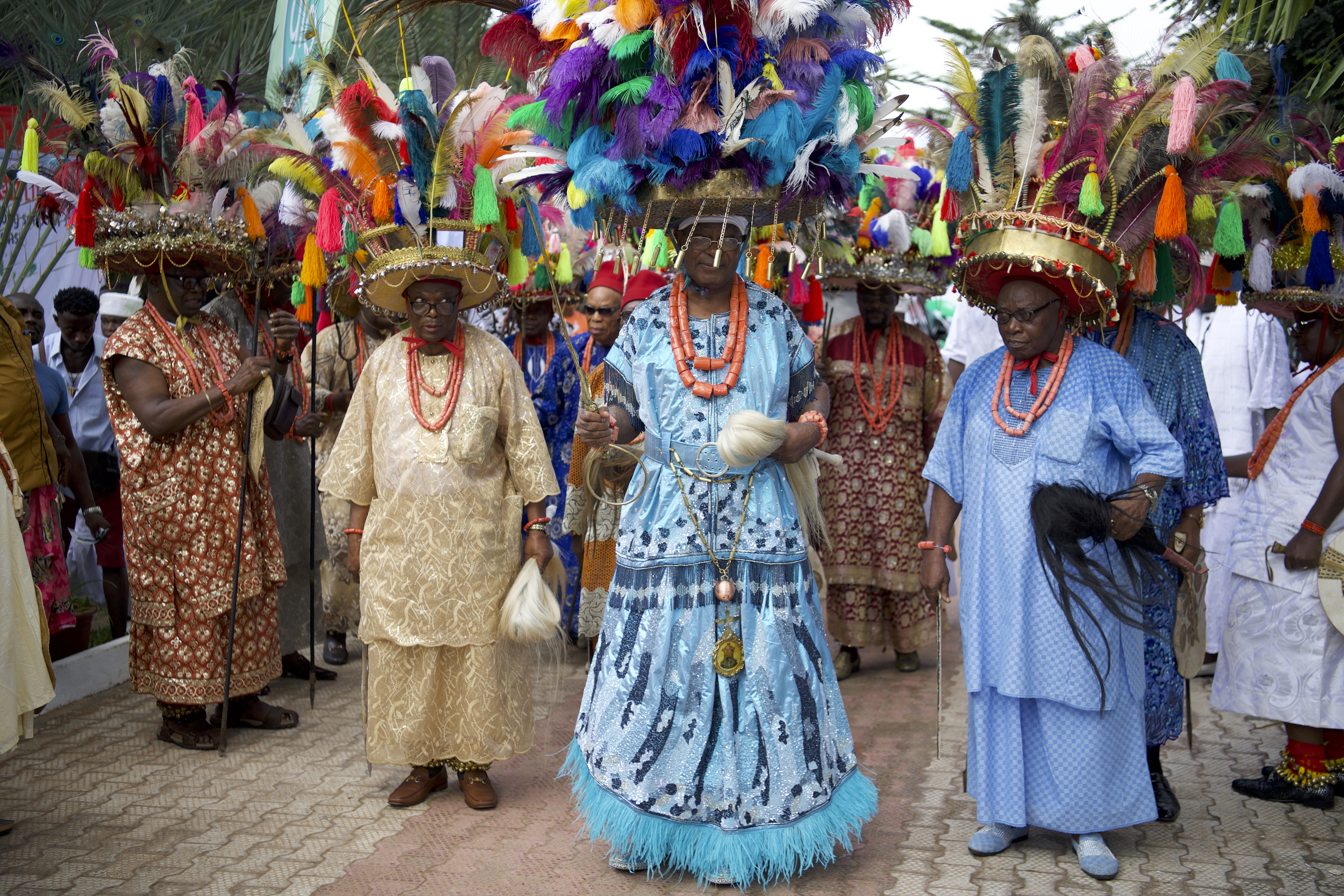
Obi of Onitsha and attendants at the Ofala festival, a traditional Igbo royal ceremony celebrated annually in southeastern Nigeria

For men, common garments include uwe mwuda or afe ntutu (robe) or efe elu, a basic shirt paired with underneath wrappers or skirts complemented by the Okpu Ozo (the feathered red cap), or Okpu aji (woolen cap), ofo, mkpara (staff) and Akupe (handfans) for ceremonial or titled occasions while loin clothes or waist wrappers were usually worn as casual wears or basic activities like hunting or farming.

Women

Traditional Igbo women's attire comprises many regional and age-based variants. The typical women's attire consist of a pair of matching wrappers known as eregbor na ntukwasi, efe obi (blouse), and Ịchafụ̀ (head-tie)

In ordinary circumstances, the women wear a short wrapper folded around the waist reaching the knee, paired with a blouse (efe obi) or tube top, and a headcloth. Traditional adornments include aka (coral beads), ngala (head beads), and mgbaji (waist beads), often complemented by other ceremonial accessories like the akupe (hand fans) and nza (horsetail whisks). Traditional attire and adornment form many parts of Igbo cultural expressions associated with age, status, ceremony, and identity.

Matching Double Wrappers (Eregbor na ntukwasi)

The eregbor na ntukwasi is a traditional women's double- wrapper attire unique to Igbo weaving traditions such as Akwete cloth. It consists of a pair of matching wrappers Descriptions of Akwete weaving note that such wrapper sets were engineered during the weaving process to be worn together. It is therefore sold in matching pairs. These wrappers are standardly paired with a blouse called uweobi and the Ichafu headdress. In ordinary circumstances, the women usually wear shorter wrappers folded around the waist wrapper and reaching the knees. This is combined with blouses or tubes and a headcloth. These clothings are also complemented with ngala, mgbaji and aka (beaded accessories) as well uli body arts. In some regions, The Uli body art was also used to decorate both men and women in the form of lines forming patterns and shapes on the body.

Uweobi (Blouse)

To complete the silhouette, the double wrapper set is paired with a Blouse (or uweobi), a traditional fitted blouse. knee-length wrapper styles are usually paired with tubular blouses.

Ichafu (Ichafo)

Ichafu is a head-tie or headdress worn by Igbo women, especially for church services, ceremonies and other social occasions. It forms part of a broader clothing ensemble that may include wrappers, blouses and jewellery. Tying the ichafu can be quite laborious, sometimes requiring assistance to achieve a satisfactory style, which usually involves folding, twisting and pinning to achieve the desired form. It is typically worn matching the accompanying traditional attire their dialectical variations for Ichafu is Akwaisi, ulari, unari, nsu n'isi, ufu isi, asusu isi, nchafu, Akishi. In the descriptions and analyses of Chimamanda Adichie watching her mother dress in the Igbo fashion of tying eregbor na ntukwasi and Ichafu, the process of tying the Ichafu involved folding, twisting and pinning until it sits on the head like a large flower

Ichafu can take many forms and styles. Depending on the fabric, amount of material and method of tying, it may range from a relatively simple head covering to a high, large, voluminous, layered, folded, pleated, sculptural or otherwise elaborate arrangement. Descriptions of Igbo women's attire document both a “big head tie” known as Ichafu and arrangements in which the headwrap is folded, twisted and pinned into a large flower-like form.

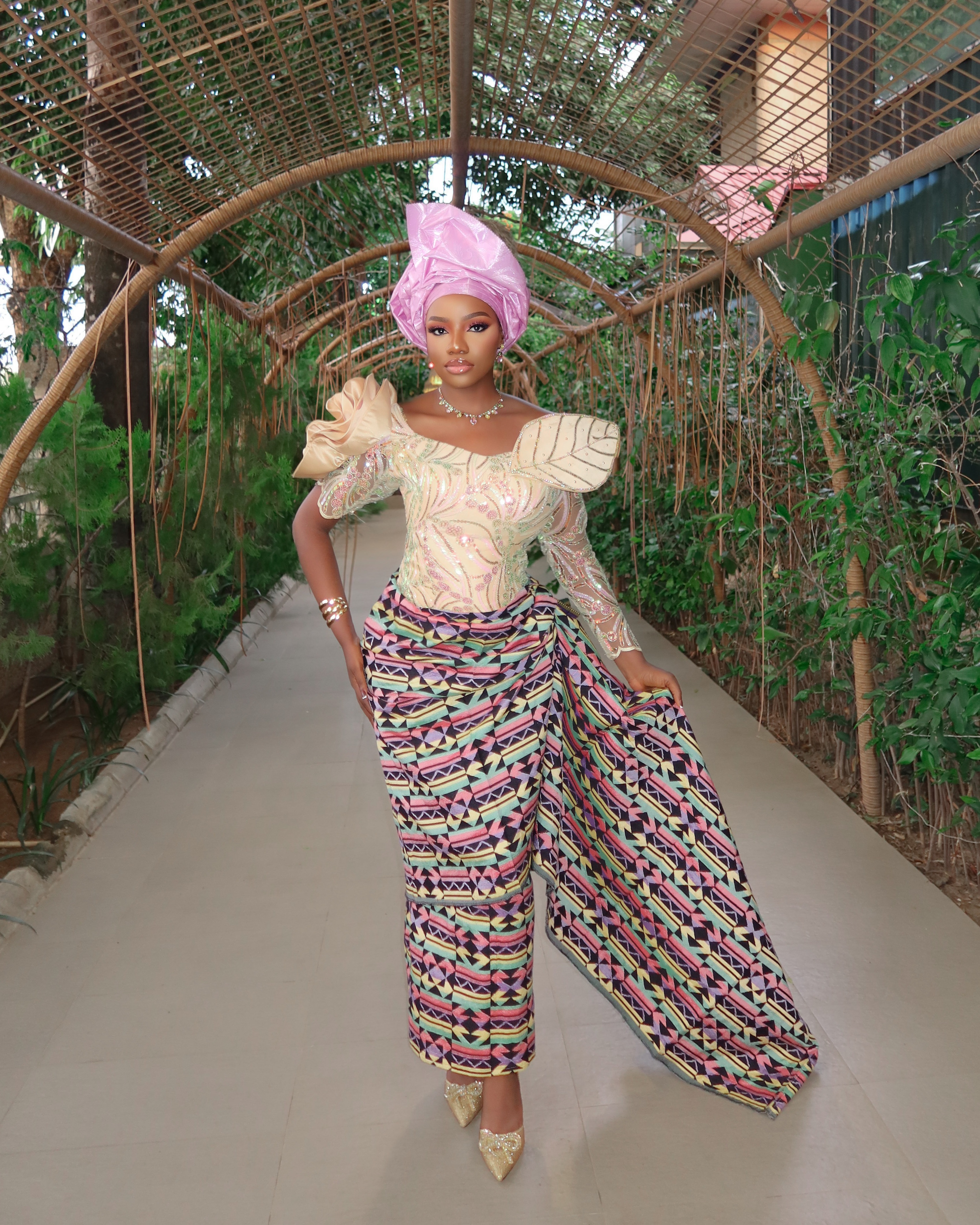
Igbo women’s traditional attire showing Obiakwa(matching double wrappers) made of Akwete George, uweobi (blouse with puffed sleeves) and Ichafu (Ichafo) headdress

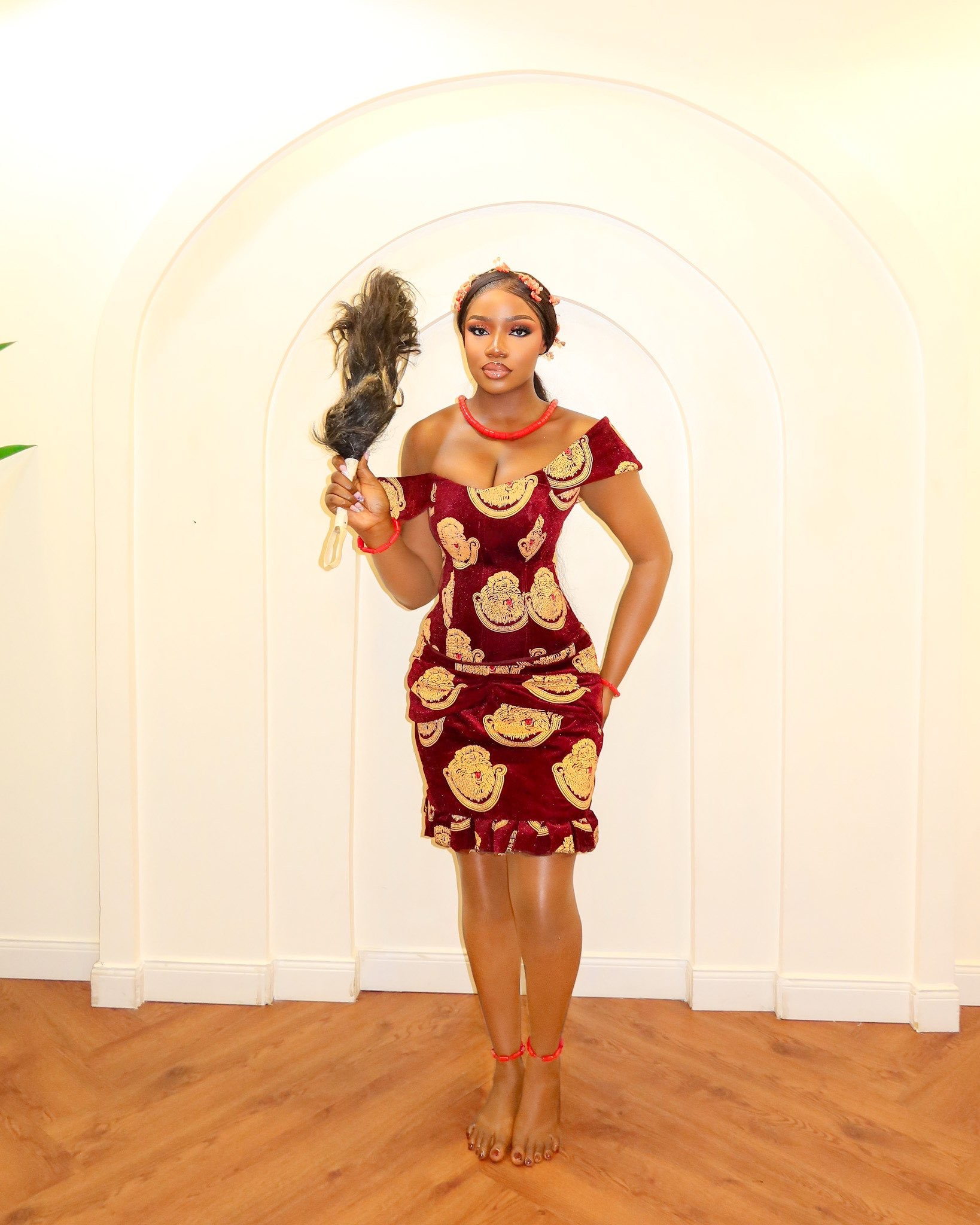
A knee lengtha wrapper style paired with a fitted blouse, complemented by odu enyi or nza (flywhisk), ngala (head beads), and other beaded accessories. The textile features Isiagu motif

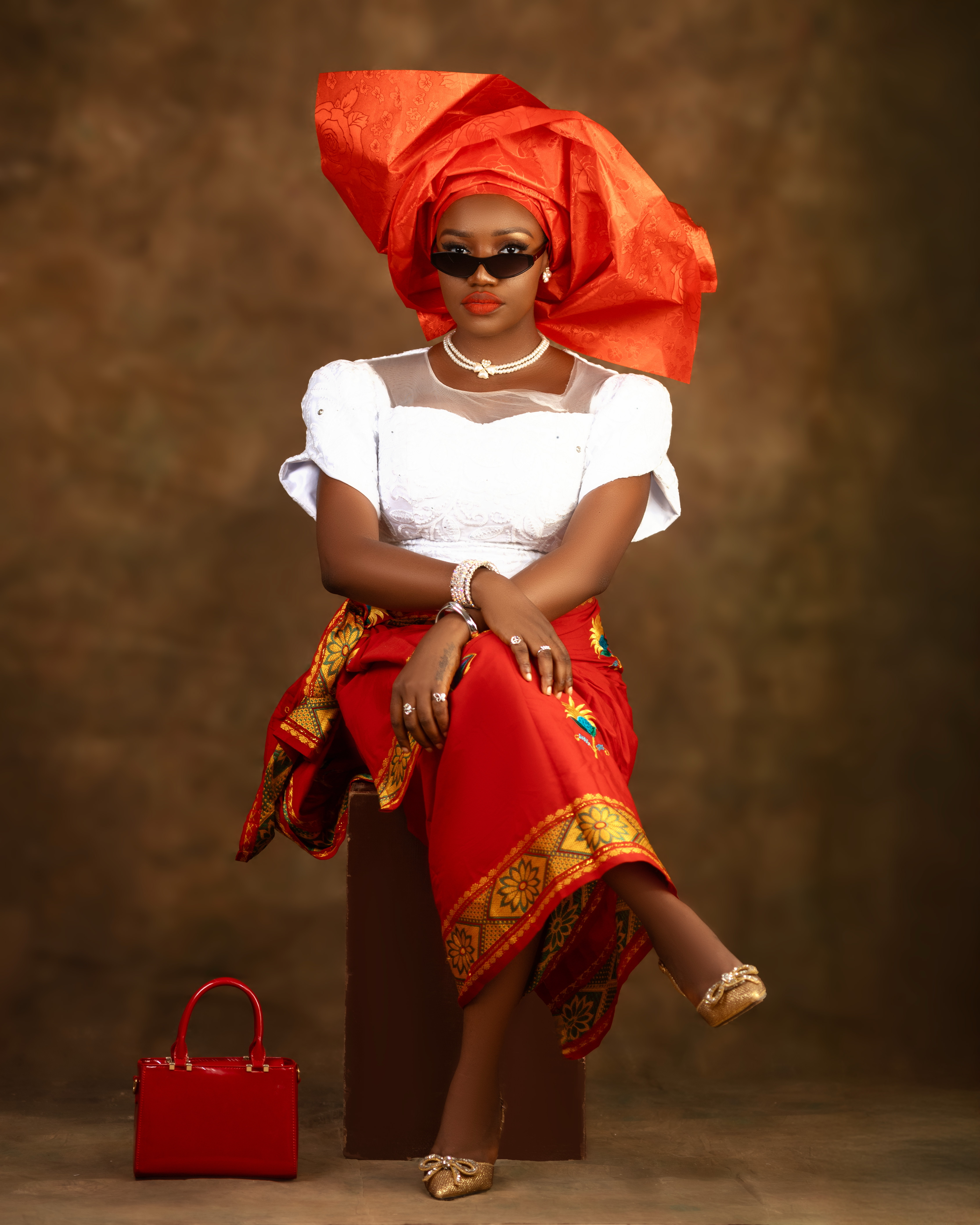
An Igbo woman dressed in traditional attire consisting of a white puff-sleeve blouse, a red and gold double George wrapper, and Ichafu (Ichafo) headdress sitting like a large flower on her head, accessorised with pearl jewelry.

Textiles

Textiles commonly used across Igbo land include Isiagu (often patterned with the tiger or Lion head motifs), Akwete and Akwaocha handwoven clothes, and richly patterned George wrappers.

Women carried their babies on their backs with a strip of clothing binding the two with a knot at her chest. This baby carrying technique was and still is practiced by many people groups across Africa, including the Igbo. This method has been modernized in the form of the child carrier. Both men and women wore wrappers.

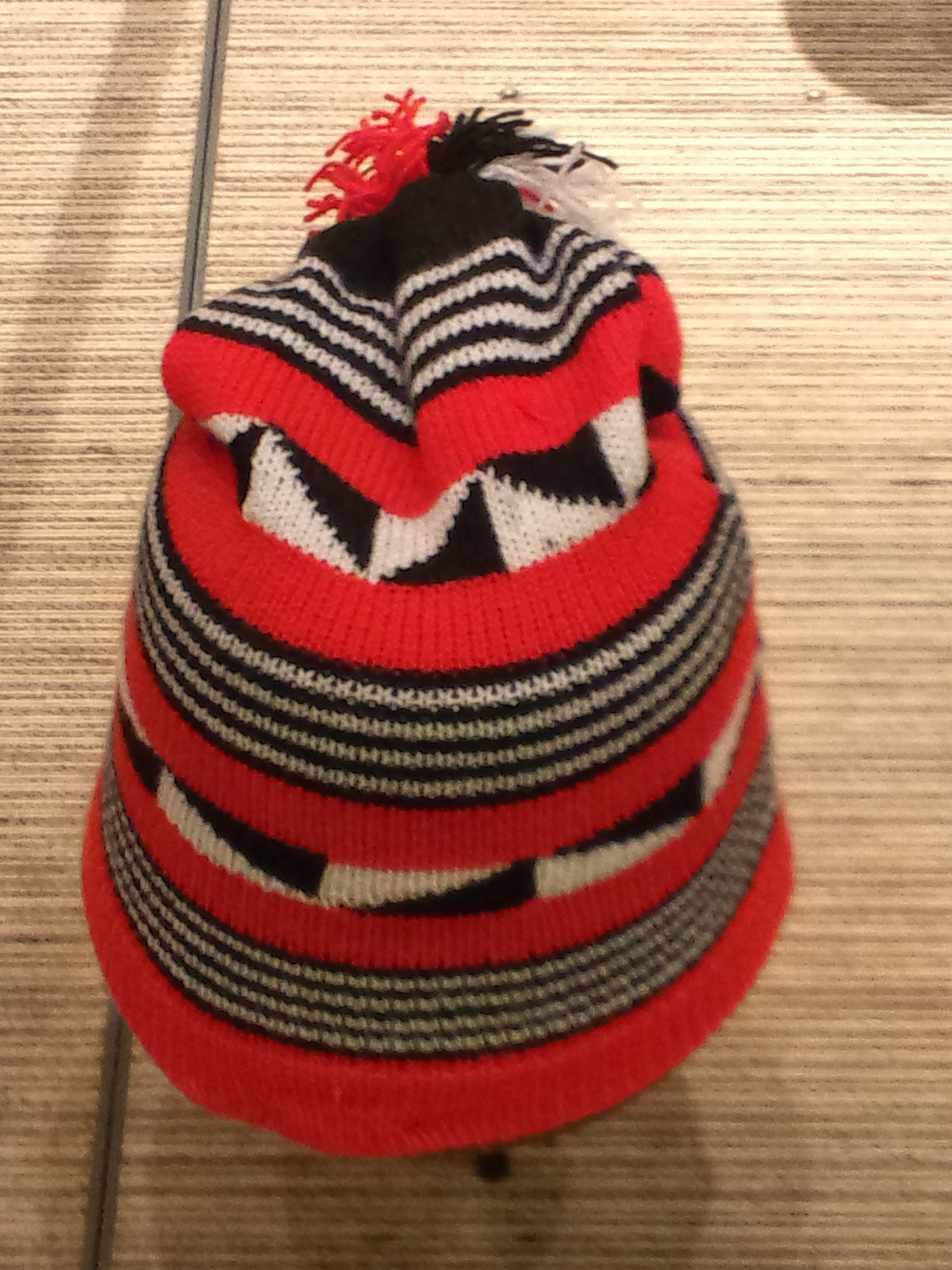
A traditional Igbo hat made entirely from wool.

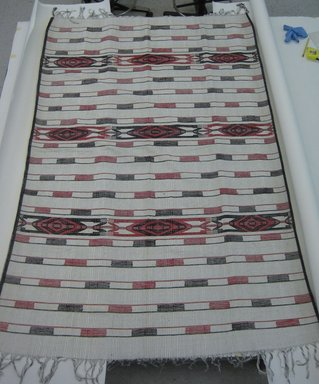
Akwete cloth, a traditional Igbo textile originating from Akwete town in Abia State, southeastern Nigeria

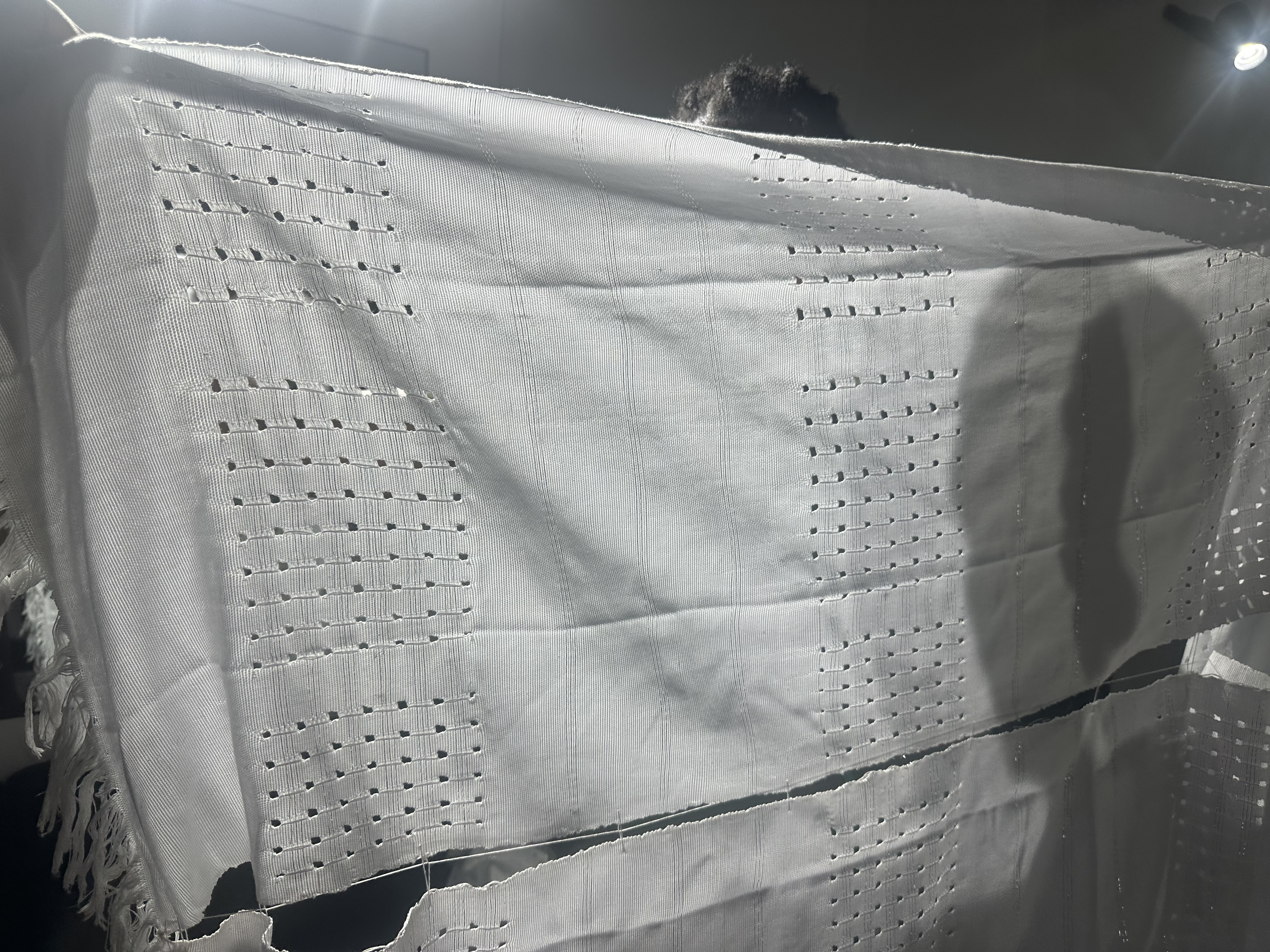
Akwa ocha, a handwoven fabric used in traditional ceremonies by the Anioma and Onitsha Igbo people of southeastern Nigeria

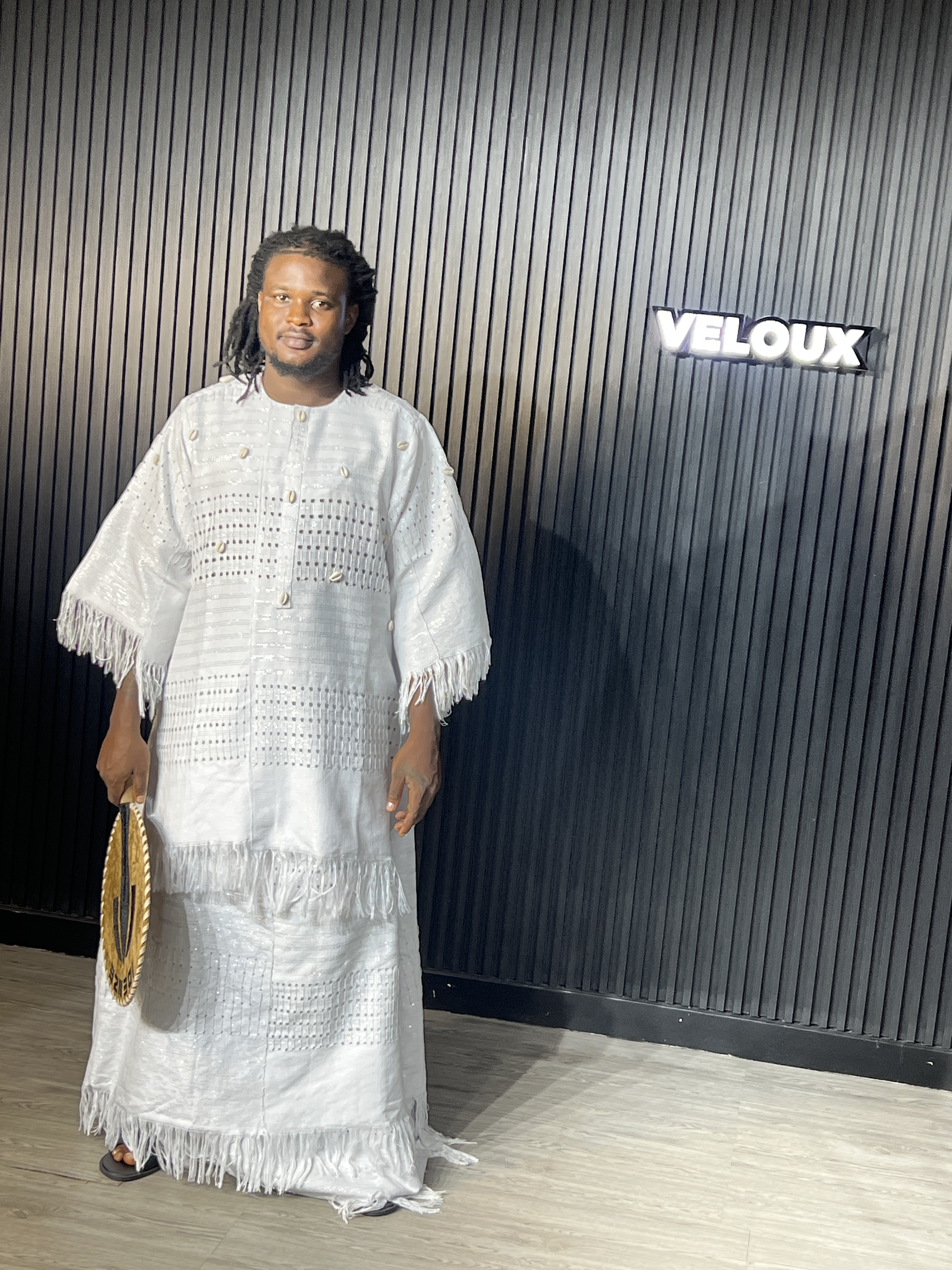
Igbo man in akwa ocha, southeastern Nigeria

== Chieftaincy Title ==
Highly accomplished men and women are admitted into their noble orders for people of title such as Ndi Ozo or Ndi Nze. These people receive insignia to show their stature. Membership is highly exclusive, and to qualify an individual need to be highly regarded and well-spoken of in the community.

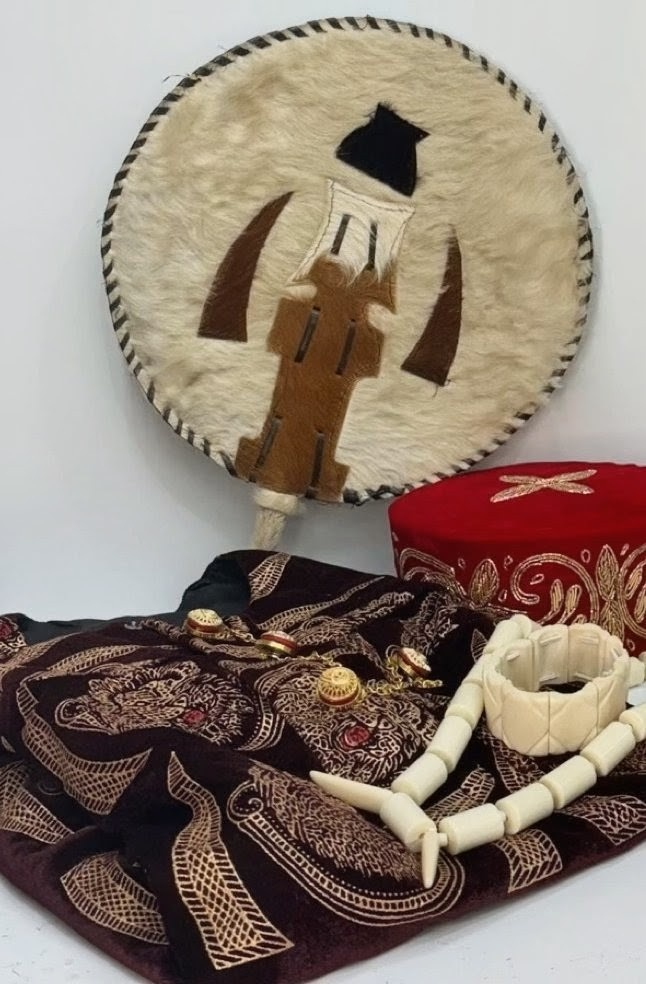
The sacred regalia of an Igbo titled man, southeastern Nigeria

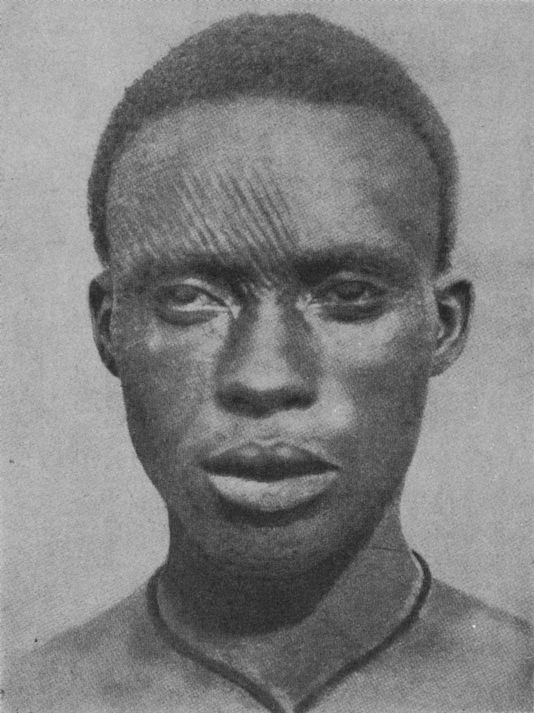
An Igbo man with Ichi marks, a sign of rank as an Ozo

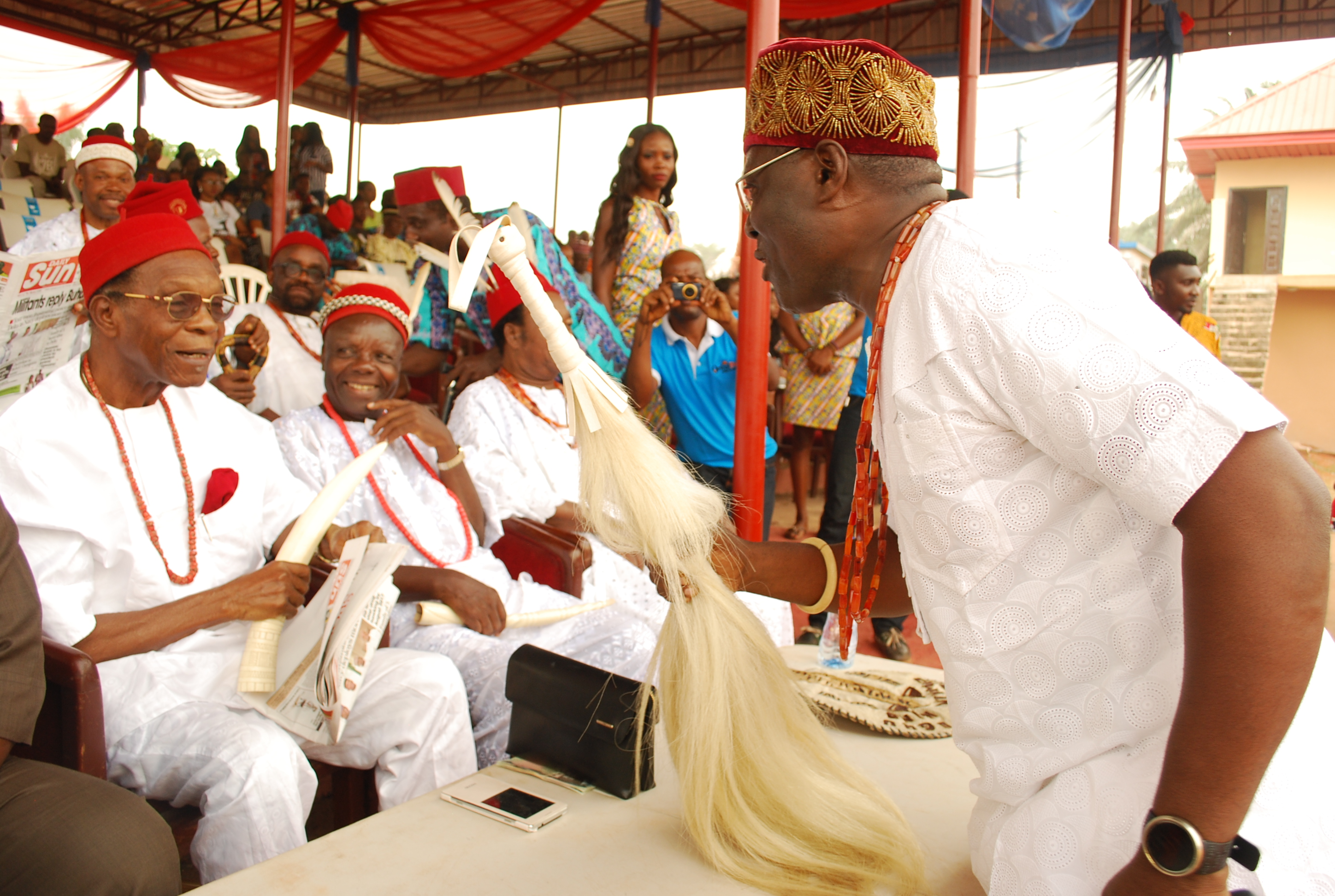
Nze and Ozo titled men of Nimo in traditional ceremonial attire, southeastern Nigeria

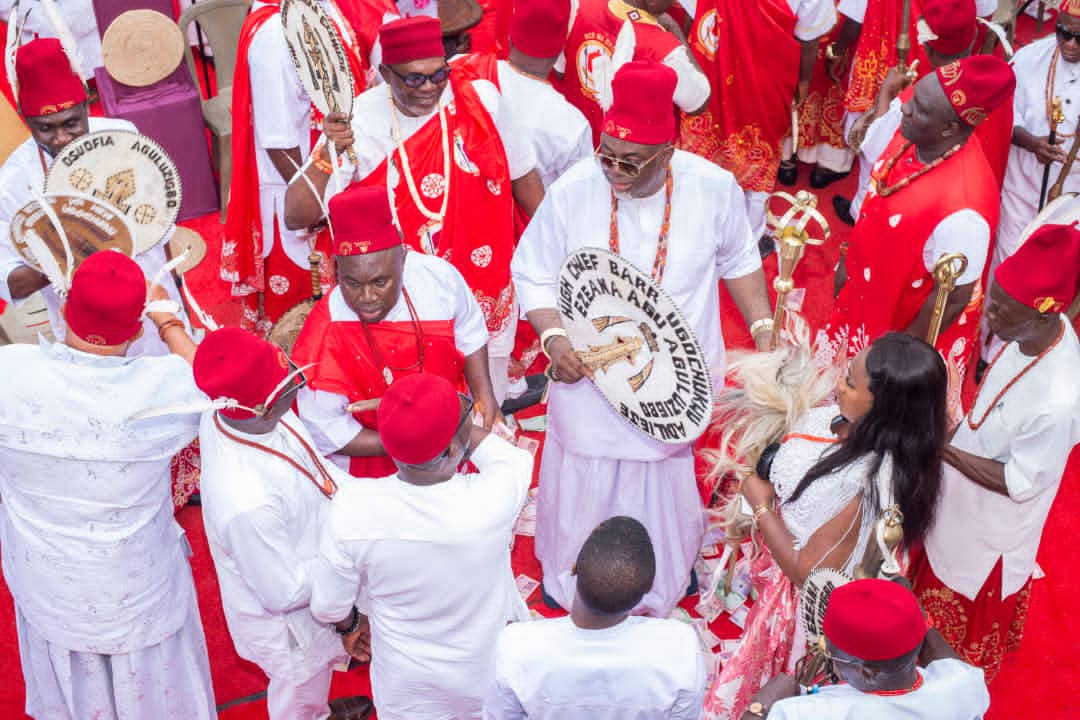
Igbo Red Cap Chiefs and titled men in traditional white and red attire at a cultural ceremony in Igboland, southeastern Nigeria

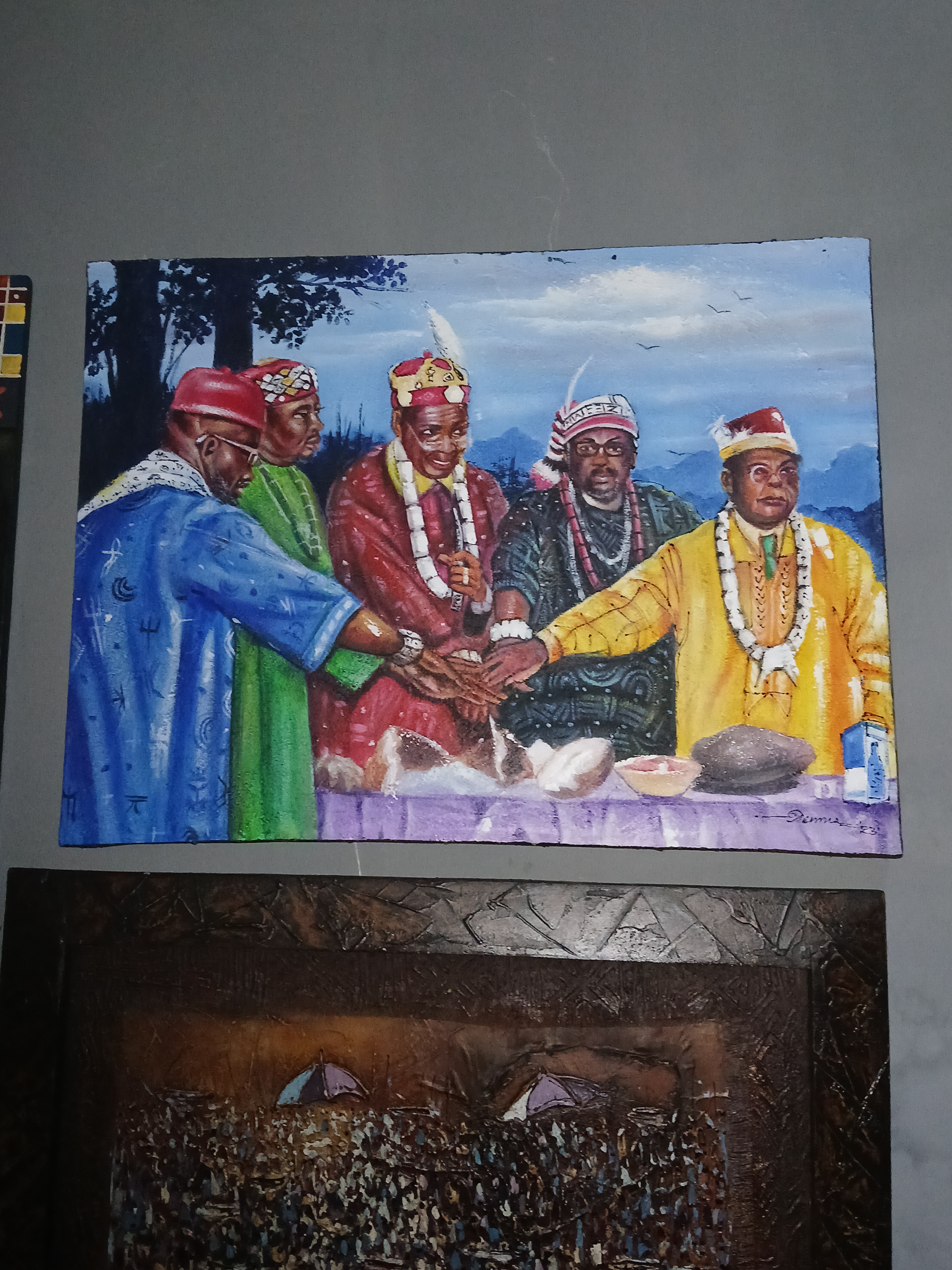
Painting depicting an Igbo king and his cabinet casting lots and setting laws, with ọfọ and ọgụ, symbols of truth and justice in Igbo traditional governance

== Apprenticeship ==
The Igbo have a unique form of apprenticeship in which either a male family member or a community member will spend time (usually in their teens to their adulthood) with another family, when they work for them. After the time spent with the family, the head of the host household, who is usually the older man who brought the apprentice into his household, will establish (Igbo: idu) the apprentice by either setting up a business for him or giving money or tools by which to make a living.

This practice was exploited by Europeans, who used this practice as a way of trading in enslaved people. Olaudah Equiano, although stolen from his home, was an Igbo person who was forced into service to an African family. He said that he felt part of the family, unlike later, when he was shipped to North America and enslaved in the Thirteen Colonies.

The Igbo apprenticeship system is called Imu Ahia or Igba Boy in Igboland. It became more prominent among the Igbos after the Nigerian civil war, in a quest to survive the £20 policy which was proposed by Obafemi Awolowo that only £20 be given to every Biafran citizen to survive on regardless of what they had in the bank before the war and the rest of the money were held by the Nigerian government.

Petty trade was one of the only ways to build back destroyed communities as well as farming, but then, farming required time that was not readily available at that moment. Essentially, most people went into trading.

This Imu-Ahia/Igba Boy model was simple, it works in such a way that business owners would take in younger boys which can be relative, sibling or non-relative from same region, house them and have them work as apprentices in business while learning how it works and the secrets of the business. After the allotted time for the training was reached, 5–8 years’ time, a little graduation ceremony would be held for the Nwa Boy (the person that learnt the trade). He would also be paid a lump sum for their services over the years, and the money will be used to start a business for the Nwa Boy.

== Osu caste system ==
Osu are a group of people whose ancestors were dedicated to serving in shrines and temples for the deities of the Igbo, and therefore were deemed property of the gods. Relationships and sometimes interactions with Osu were (and to this day, still are) in many cases, forbidden.

To this day being called an Osu remains a stigma that prevents people's progress and lifestyles.

== Calendar (Iguafo Igbo) ==
In the traditional Igbo calendar, a week (Igbo: Izu) has 4 days (Igbo: Ubochi) (Eke, Orie, Afọ, Nkwọ), seven weeks make one month (Igbo: Ọnwa), a month has 28 days and there are 13 months in a year. In the last month, an extra day is added. The names of the days have their roots in the mythology of the Kingdom of Nri. It was believed that Eri, the sky-born founder of the Nri kingdom, had gone on a journey to discover the mystery of time. On his journey he had saluted and counted the four days by the names of the spirits that governed them, and so the names of the spirits (eke, orie, afọ and Nkwo) became the days of the week.

| No. | Months (Ọnwa) | Gregorian equivalent |
|---|---|---|
| 1 | Ọnwa Mbụ | (3rd week of February) |
| 2 | Ọnwa Abụa | (March) |
| 3 | Ọnwa Ife Eke | (April) |
| 4 | Ọnwa Anọ | (May) |
| 5 | Ọnwa Agwụ | (June) |
| 6 | Ọnwa Ifejiọkụ | (July) |
| 7 | Ọnwa Alọm Chi | (August to early September) |
| 8 | Ọnwa Ilo Mmụọ | (Late September) |
| 9 | Ọnwa Ana | (October) |
| 10 | Ọnwa Okike | (Early November) |
| 11 | Ọnwa Ajana | (Late November) |
| 12 | Ọnwa Ede Ajana | (Late November to December) |
| 13 | Ọnwa Ụzọ Alụsị | (January to early February) |

An example of a month: Ọnwa Mbụ

| Eke | Orie | Afọ | Nkwọ |
|---|---|---|---|
| | | 1 | 2 |
| 3 | 4 | 5 | 6 |
| 7 | 8 | 9 | 10 |
| 11 | 12 | 13 | 14 |
| 15 | 16 | 17 | 18 |
| 19 | 20 | 21 | 22 |
| 23 | 24 | 25 | 26 |
| 27 | 28 | | |

=== Naming after market days ===
Newborn babies were sometimes named after the day of the week when born. This is no longer the fashion. Names such as Mgbeke (maiden [born] on the day of Eke), Mgborie (maiden [born] on the Orie day) are commonly seen among the Igbo people. For males, Mgbe is replaced by Nwa or "Okoro" (Igbo: Child [of]). Examples of this are Solomon Okoronkwo and Nwankwo Kanu, two popular footballers.

== Igbo masks and masquerades ==
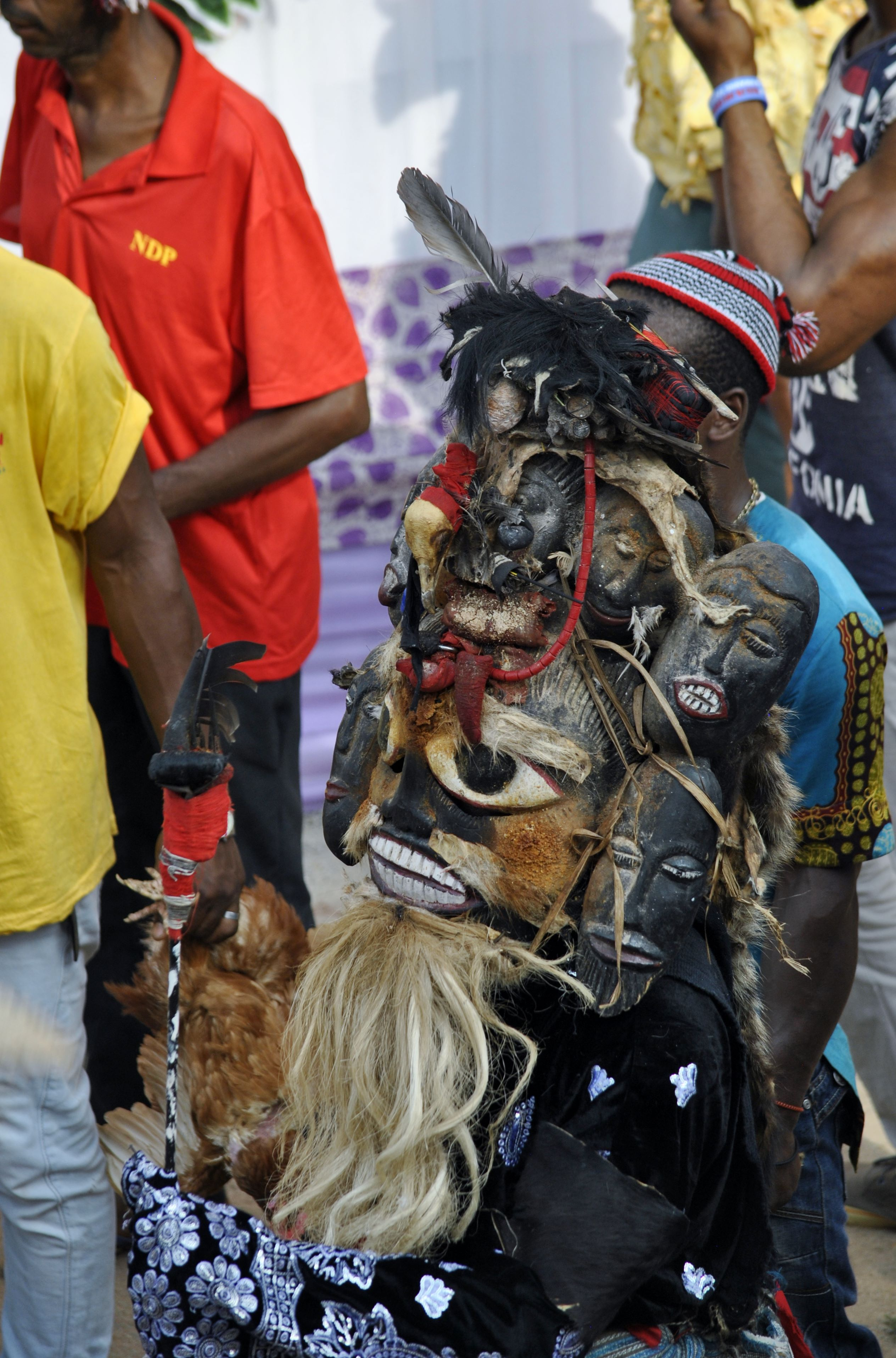
Eze Onyiudo Masquerade Awka-Etiti

There are two basic types of masquerades, visible and invisible. The visible masquerades are meant for the public. They often are more entertaining. Masks used offer a visual appeal for their shapes and forms. In these visible masquerades, performances of harassment, music, dance, and parodies are acted out (Oyeneke 25).

The invisible masquerades take place at night. Sound is the main tool for them. The masquerader uses his voice to scream so it may be heard throughout the village. The masks used are usually fierce looking and their interpretation is only fully understood by the society's members. These invisible masquerades call upon a silent village to strike fear in the hearts of those not initiated into their society.

== Kola nut (Ọjị) ==
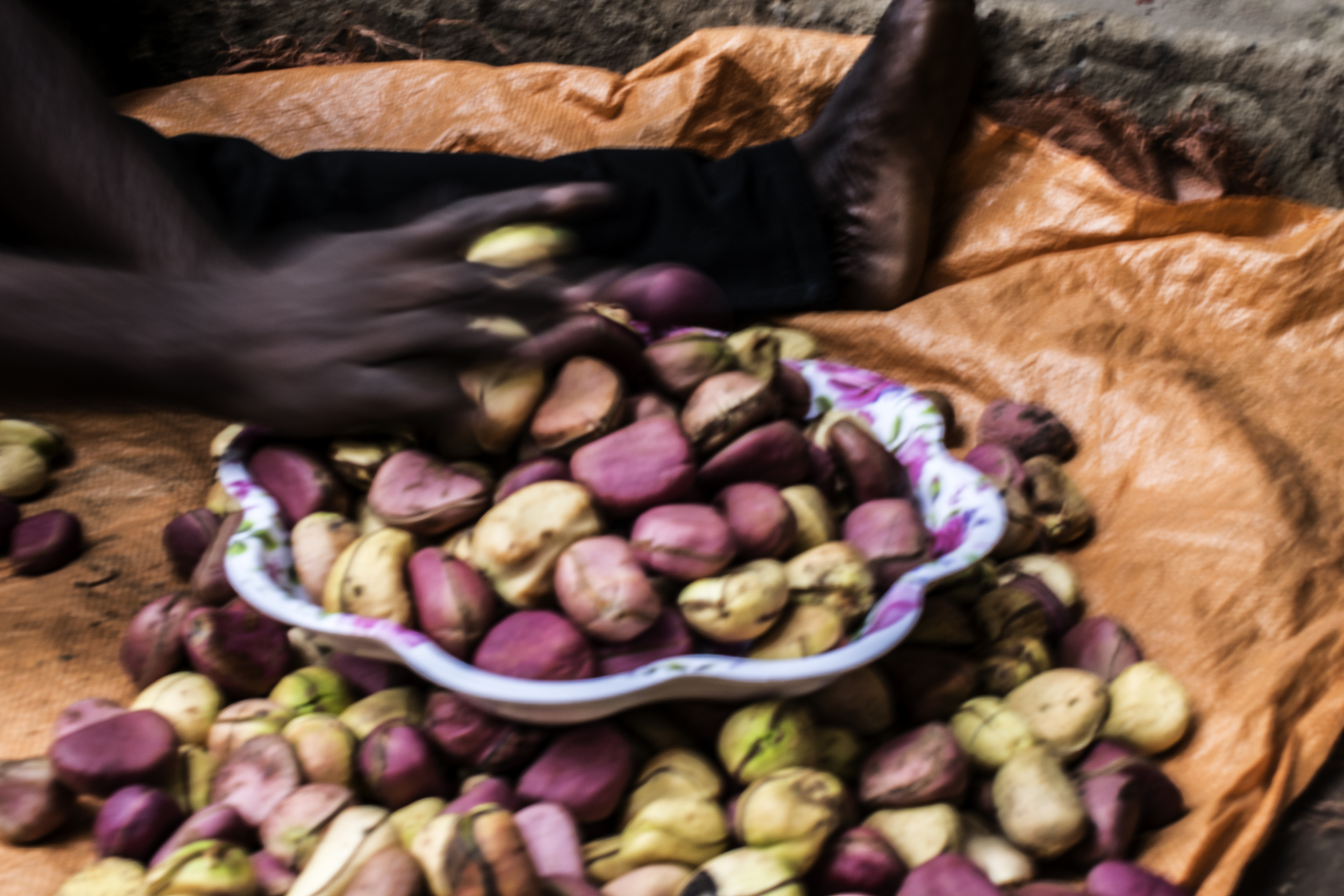
Kola nut

Kola nut (Igbo: Ọjị) occupies a unique position in the cultural life of Igbo people. Ọjị is the first thing served to any visitor in an Igbo home. Ọjị is served before an important function begins, be it marriage ceremony, settlement of family disputes or entering into any type of agreement. Ọjị is traditionally broken into pieces by hand, and if the Kola nut breaks into 3 pieces a special celebration is arranged.

== See also ==
- Biafra
