= Jacob Nguni =

Cameroonian musician (1956–2015)

- Also known as: Pa Jay; Micro-wave
- Born: 22 November 1956; Kumba, Cameroon
- Died: 25 April 2015 (aged 58) Washington, D.C., United States
- Occupations: Musician; songwriter
- Years active: 1974–2015
- Formerly of: Rocafil Jazz; Waza Collection; A.B. Waza; Rocafil.W.I; Jacob Nguni & the Sweet Mother Band

Jacob Nguni (22 November 1956 – 25 April 2015), nicknamed "Pa Jay" or "Micro-wave", was a Cameroonian highlife singer and guitarist. His partnership with Prince Nico Mbarga produced the hit song "Sweet Mother", which redefined the era of highlife music in Africa.

Nguni died in his sleep on 25 April 2015 in Washington, D.C.

== Early years ==
Jacob Nguni was born on 22 November 1956 in Fiango, Kumba, as the last of his parents' four children. He loved music from a young age and began to play guitar in college. He eventually moved to Nigeria.

== Career ==
Once in Nigeria, Nguni joined Prince Nico Mbarga's Rocafil Jazz band, which saw success with the hit song "Sweet Mother".

In the early 1980s, Nguni left Rocafil Jazz to form Waza Collection, also known as Waza Rocafil Jazz. They released the albums Nigeria '79 and Bride & Bridegroom, both in 1980. The group was later renamed to A.B. Waza and issued the EP Congratulations in 1984. Nguni also launched a collaboration with Martinican musician Bud Guilbert, known as Rocafil.W.I, which released several records in the 1980s.

Later in life, Nguni moved to the United States and remained musically active, sometimes performing with Jacob Nguni & the Sweet Mother Band.

== Ill-health and death ==
Nguni was diagnosed with leukemia early in 2010 and died on 25 April 2015, in Washington, D.C.
