= Nguni =

Nguni may refer to:

- Nguni (surname), including a list of people with the name
- Nguni peoples, an ethnolinguistic group of Bantu ethnic groups native to Southern Africa
  - Nguni languages
- Nguni cattle, a cattle breed

== See also ==
- Nguni homestead, a cluster of several houses
- Nguni shield, a traditional, pointed oval-shaped, ox or cowhide shield
- Nguni stick-fighting, a martial art
