= Odogwu =

Igbo cultural title

Odogwu (pronounced [Òdógwú]) is an Igbo word which means a war-chief, captain, champion. Odogwu historically referred to a great man that won multiple battles, though the modern usage of the word usually refers to an affluent man with resources in contemporary discourse, symbolized by man-hood and wealth.

== History ==
Odogwu was usually used on men who were victorious in battle. The nineteenth-century British army officer, and surgeon Africanus Horton, described Odogwu among the Igbo and notes that it was associated with rank and martial distinction:

"One distinguishing rank among the Egboes is the Odogo, or captain of war, of which there are several grades; the title is distinguished by the individual carrying on his cap a long feather which signifies that the wearer has killed in war a person of rank"

The 1882 English-Igbo dictionary also defined Odogwu as a "war-chief", demonstrating its original definition as a military title, associated with leadership in war.

== Traditional chieftaincy and succession ==
The Odogwu title has also appeared in historical disputes concerning traditional chieftaincy succession. In Amumu, historical records concerning the Ezeship describe Odogwu as a successor within the succession to the traditional ruler and identify his descendants as claimants to the title. This account illustrates the role of the Odogwu title within traditional systems of authority, lineage, and succession.

In Onicha-Ugbo, the Odogwu is a traditional title associated with military leadership and the execution of warfare. The Odogwu serves as the principal war general, responsible for implementing military plans following a community decision to wage war. The title also has an established place within the community’s traditional leadership structure, with historical accounts documenting its installation, succession, and disputes concerning its holders.

The term Odogwu also appears in descriptions of traditional Igbo spiritual performances. In accounts of masquerade traditions, Odogwu anya mmei is identified as a figure associated with spirit performance and described as “the bloody-eyed wonder.” Such references illustrate the term’s use in cultural and ritual contexts beyond its association with traditional titles and leadership.

Odogwu as a title has also appeared in historical disputes concerning traditional chieftaincy succession. In Amumu, historical records concerning the Ezeship describe Odogwu as a successor within the succession to the traditional ruler and identify his descendants as claimants to the title. This illustrates the role of the Odogwu title within traditional authority, lineage, and succession.

== Pop culture ==
In modern pop-culture, Odogwu is commonly used as a colloquial term for a wealthy, successful, and charismatic man, often associated with confidence, leadership, generosity, influence, ambition, courage, and social prestige. The term is frequently used as a compliment to describe individuals perceived as accomplished, respected, and capable, particularly those who display financial success, authority, or exceptional achievement. In contemporary Nigerian media and everyday speech, Odogwu has become synonymous with a "big man" or a person of high status whose presence commands admiration and respect. Burna Boy, a Grammy Award-winning Nigerian singer and songwriter, released “Odogwu” in 2020, drawing on the traditional Igbo concept of Odogwu, a title associated with courage, achievement, leadership, and resilience. The song incorporates Igbo cultural identity into contemporary Afrofusion music, celebrating success and overcoming adversity while bringing wider international attention to the cultural significance of the term.

== See also ==
- Igbo language
- Igbo culture
