= Sweet Mother =

1976 song by Prince Nico Mbarga and Rocafil Jazz

"Sweet Mother" is a highlife song by the Cameroonian and Nigerian singer Prince Nico Mbarga and his band Rocafil Jazz, released in 1976.

The demo tape of "Sweet Mother" was turned down by EMI in 1974, citing the song's "childish appeal". "Sweet Mother" was later also rejected by Decca and Philips Records, before it was eventually released in December 1976, by Rogers All Stars, a Nigerian recording company based in Onitsha.

The song is a celebration of motherhood, sung in Nigerian Pidgin English. The music is West African highlife, with Congolese soukous-style guitar finger-picking.

"Sweet Mother" went on to become one of the most popular hits in Africa, selling between 3 and 13 million copies. Sometimes called "Africa's anthem", it was voted the continent's favourite song by BBC readers and listeners in 2004, coming before Brenda Fassie's "Vuli Ndlela", Fela Kuti's "Lady", Franco's "Mario", and Miriam Makeba's version of "Malaika".
