= Okpu Agu =

Traditional Igbo and Cross River warrior cap

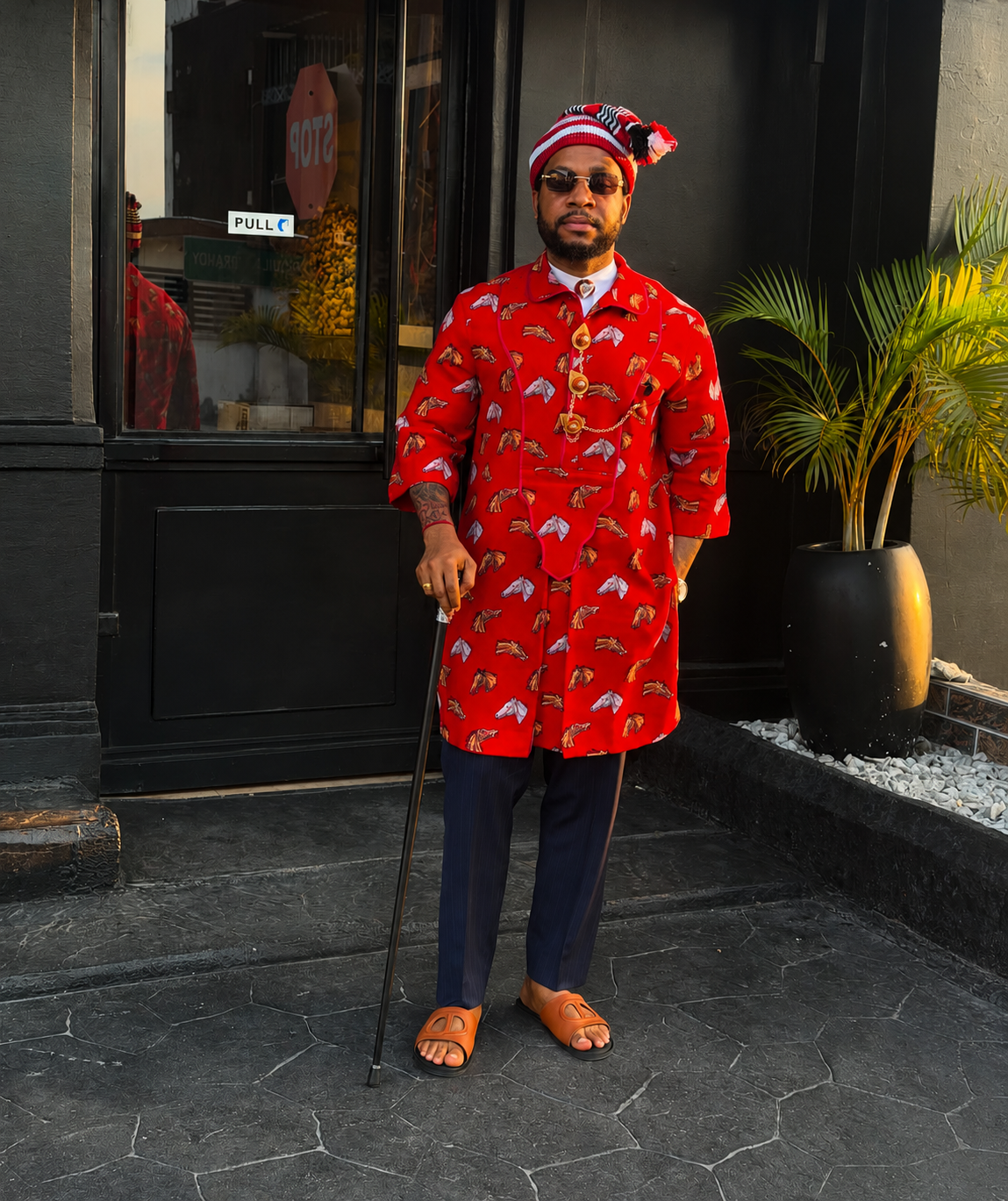
- A man wearing an Okpu Agu with traditional Igbo attire
- Type: Traditional cap
- Material: Knitted wool

Okpu Agu (Igbo: okpu agụ, meaning “leopard cap”) is a traditional knitted cap associated with parts of southeastern Nigeria, particularly Ohafia and neighbouring communities. It is commonly worn with Igbo ceremonial clothing and stands out because of its elongated shape and striped red, black, and white design. The cap is historically associated to warfare, achievement, and social status, even though its meaning and use vary across Igbo communities. The Okpu Agu is worn at festivals, traditional weddings, funerals, chieftaincy events, and msny other public occasions. It has also appeared in contemporary Nigerian fashion and popular culture.

== Etymology ==
TThe name Okpu Agu literally means “leopard cap.” In Igbo, okpu means “cap”, while agụ means “leopard”. In Ohafia society, the leopard symbolized personal power and achievement, making the cap an appropriate emblem of the accomplished warrior. The name of the cap mirror the association with these qualities including its visual resemblance to the markings of a leopard and is understood to represent the skin of a leopard.

== Design ==
The Okpu Agu is usually knitted from wool and shaped into a long cone with a rounded "end" or “tail.” Traditional examples would combine red, black, and white stripes. The stripes are understood as an abstract representation of a leopard’s markings. The direction in which the tail is worn shows the wearer’s mood or circumstances. A tail positioned toward the front is said to indicate progress or an important undertaking, while a tail worn to either side may be associated with celebration. A backward-facing tail has sometimes been interpreted as a sign of mourning or personal difficulty. A closely related cap known as Okpu Mboko woven in only black and white was reserved for the highest ranks in the Ekpe society.

== Historical significance ==
The Okpu Agu is associated with the warrior traditions of Ohafia. Although similarly shaped caps became common across southern Nigeria, McCall found that caps bearing the particular black, white, and red pattern were recognized as Ohafia war caps. The cap was knitted from wool, and the striped design was understood to represent the pattern of a leopard skin. Warfare historically occupied an important place in Ohafia social life, and thus military accomplishment brought recognition, status, and honour. Memories of warfare were preserved through oral narratives, songs, material objects, and performances like iri agha, the Ohafia war dance. McCall argues that these performances allowed the community to experience and interpret its history through music, movement, costume, and narration. The Okpu Agu formed part of the visual language through which courage, achievement, and warrior identity were represented.

In Ohafia society, the leopard represented a form of power that one could claim through individual accomplishment. The Okpu Agu consequently embodied both the strength of the warrior and the principle that elicit honour from a person’s actions. Throughout history, the cap was part of the uniform of an accomplished warrior and could not be worn by a man until he had distinguished himself by returning from battle with a human head as a trophy. Affiah and Osuagwu also describe the cap as a means of identifying men of valour who had faced the dangers of warfare.

The colours of the cap also had meanings that connected with the warrior’s experience. Red represented danger and blood, black represented death, and white mirrored the peace that followed a successful campaign. Red was historically restricted to ufiem, men who had taken human heads in warfare. Oral accounts also reported that the caps were once dyed with the blood of human victims.

The eagle feather worn with the cap was a separate honour, and there were stricter rules about who could wear it. It was specifically awarded by the village elders who has recognized a person's accomplishment, and a man who wore a feather without having earned it could be ordered to remove it or fined. McCall reported that restrictions surrounding the wearing cap had weakened by the time of his fieldwork in 1990 and 1991, when children and young men could wear it, the eagle feather, however, was still reserved for those who had earned it.

Ohafia warriors also fought as mercenaries for the Aro during the eighteenth and nineteenth centuries while retaining their political autonomy. McCall argues the Okpu Agu to be expressive of the complicated relationship between the individual power of the Ohafia warrior and the sovereign authority of Aro leadership. The warrior might act in the service of the Aro, but the honour and power represented by the cap were understood to have been earned through his own actions.

== Relationship with Ekpe ==
The Okpu Agu is also connected with the symbolism of Ekpe, an influential social institution found among Igbo, Efik, Ibibio, and other communities in southeastern Nigeria and parts of Cameroon. The leopard was a central symbol of Ekpe and represented power, authority, and social statues. Unlike societies in which leopard imagery was reserved for a king, Ohafia had no centralized monarchy. McCall argues that the leopard metaphor was available to men who could claim it through personal accomplishment. Accomplished warriors carried their cutlasses in leopard-skin sheaths and wore the Okpu Agu as a visible expression of this earned power.

A black-and-white variation known as Okpu Mboko has also been described as an item reserved for members holding highest ranks in the Ekpe society. The meaning and use of these caps may have differed across communities and historical periods. Among the Arondizuogu, members of the Ekpe na Mboko society participate in a periodic procession during the Ikeji festival. Their ceremonial clothing includes Ukara cloth, a traditional top, and a matching woollen cap identified as Okpu Jioji.

== Women and the Okpu Agu ==
Although the Okpu Agu was primarily associated with male warriors, historical accounts show that women could also adopt clothing and symbols linked with warrior identity and masculine authority. An example of this was a woman named Nne Uko, who wore the Okpu Agu, carried a warrior’s cutlass, and performed the male style of the iri agha war dance. This was an exceptional claim to warrior status, since the right to wear the complete uniform was traditionally restricted even among men. McCall further records that Nne Uko wore men's clothing, married two wives, joined men's societies such as Ekpe, and acquired the right to dance alongside men. She was recognized as a dike nwami, a term translated as “brave woman”, “warrior woman”, or “heroine”.

Mbah also discusses women in early twentieth-century Igboland who crossed established gender boundaries through their clothing, occupations, marriages, wealth, and participation in institutions commonly associated with men. Among them was Unyang Uka, who was remembered as Unyang Okpu Agu, or the “Leopard Cap Female Chief”, because she regularly wore the cap. This shows that the Okpu Agu could communicate bravery, leadership, and social authority beyond its customary association with male warriors.

According to fieldwork by McCall, the Ohafia oral tradition also preserves the story of Nne Mgbafo, a woman who dressed as a warrior and travelled to Ibibioland after her husband failed to return from battle. Different versions recount that she found and buried his body, forced his captors to release him, or killed an enemy and presented the trophy head as her husband's achievement. Despite these differences, each version ends with her triumphant return to Ohafia and her recognition as a dike nwami.

== Ikpirikpe Ogu war dance ==
The Okpu Agu forms part of the costume used in Ikpirikpe Ogu, also known as iri agha, the Ohafia war dance. Drawing on Ohafia’s history of warfare, the performance combines music, dance, costume, narration, and dramatic reenactment to preserve and interpret the community’s historical memory.

The dancers wear clothing associated with earlier warriors and reproduce movements drawn from battle. The lead dancer carries an oyaya, a basket representing the heads taken by warriors, holds a machete, and place a palm frond in his mouth, while other performers imitate combat movements. Musicians and narrators accompany the dance with songs and accounts celebrating the achievements of recognized warriors. The essence in these performance is to presents courage, strength, honour, prestige, masculinity, and communal identity as lived parts of Ohafia history. The Okpu Agu visually contributes to this by connecting the dancers with the warriors whose accomplishments they reenact.

The oyaya carried on the lead dancer’s head represents three human heads wearing leopard caps. It recalls the trophy heads taken by ancestral warriors and is used as part of the war-dance costume. McCall describes the figures on the oyaya as sculpted wooden heads, not human skulls. Like the dancers, the carved heads wear Okpu Agu, eagle feathers, and ram’s manes, repeating the performance’s symbols of courage and fierceness. Images of the oyaya, the Okpu Agu, and other Ohafia symbols have also been reproduced through appliqué and similsr textile techniques to preserve and communicate Ohafia cultural identity.

The eagle feather attached to the Okpu Agu carries a more restricted distinction than the Okpu Agu. Village elders award the feather in recognition of personal accomplishment, and anyone who wears one without earning it may be ordered to remove it or required to pay a fine.

== General ceremonial use ==
By the time of McCall’s fieldwork in 1990 and 1991, the traditional restrictions governing the Okpu Agu had weakened. Children and young men who had not earned warrior status could wear the cap, although it continued to be recognized as a war cap. The right to wear an eagle feather remained more closely regulated. The use of the Okpu Agu has expanded beyond its earlier associations with warriors and military achievement. It is now worn at traditional weddings, funerals, festivals, chieftaincy installations, community meetings, and other ceremonial occasions. It is also worn by titled men, elders, performers, and individuals who wish to express their connection to Igbo culture.

The cap is frequently paired with the Isiagu shirt, wrappers, beads, walking sticks, and other elements of Igbo ceremonial clothing. The Okpu Agu and Isiagu, together, have become widely recognizable forms of Igbo men’s formal dress The cultural meaning of the cap, however, is not necessarily the same in every Igbo community. But the connection with warfare and warrior status is especially pronounced in Ohafia. Nowadays, wearers tend to use it more broadly as an expression of ethnic identity, cultural pride, achievement, or ceremonial respect.

== Contemporary use ==
The Okpu Agu continues to appear in Nigerian music, fashion, photography, hip-hop and popular culture. Nigerian rapper Odumodublvck has made the cap a prominent part of his public image. In a 2023 interview with Dazed, he explained that he wears it to communicate where he comes from and because he regards the music industry as a difficult environment in which he must approach obstacles with the mindset of a warrior.

His use of the cap connects its historical symbolism with a contemporary account of ambition, resilience, and cultural identity. OkayAfrica reported that his use of the Okpu Agu resonated with young audiences and contributed to the cap’s visibility as a contemporary fashion item.

Contemporary designers have also adapted the cap’s red, black, and white pattern to other forms of clothing. These include bucket hats and other streetwear designs that retain the colours of the Okpu Agu but remove the traditional elongated shape and tail.

== Relationship to other Igbo caps ==
The Okpu Agu is sometimes confused with the plain red caps worn by titled men and elders in some Igbo communities. However, these caps do not necessarily have the same history or social meaning.

The Okpu Agu is traditionally distinguished by its knitted form, striped colours, and association with the leopard, warfare, bravery, and achievement. The plain red cap is more commonly connected with age, title, political authority, or membership in institutions such as Nze na Ozo, although practices differ among communities

Terms like Okpu Ozo, Okpu Mme, and Okpu Ododo have been used for particular types of red caps, but their meanings and the rules governing who may wear them vary across Igboland. The Okpu Agu should therefore not be treated as interchangeable with every form of Igbo red cap.

== See also ==
- Okpu Ozo
- Isiagu
- Nze na Ozo
- Ohafia
- Ekpe
- Aro Confederacy
- Odumodublvck
- Igbo people
- Igbo regalia and headdresses
