= Nguni (surname) =

Nguni is an African surname. Notable people with the surname include:

- Jacob Nguni (1956–2015), Cameroonian singer and guitarist
- Sylvester Nguni (born 1955), Zimbabwean politician
- Tehn Diamond (Tendai Ryan Nguni, born 1985), Zimbabwean singer-songwriter

== See also ==
- Nguni peoples
