= Okpu Ozo =

Igbo traditional cap

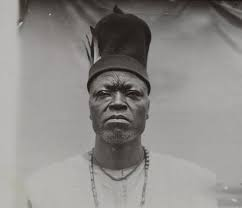
Chief Obudugbo Ezeana of Neni (Modern day Anambra State) 1910-1911 with Okpu Ozo (Red cap)

The Okpu Ozo (Igbo: Okpu ọzọ) or Okpu Mme, or Okpu Ododo is a traditional red cap worn by titled igbo men. Hats or caps on pendants have been excavated in Igboland in Igbo-Ukwu dated back to the 9th - 11th century. The Igbo red cap is one of the most recognizable symbols of traditional authority, honor, and cultural identity among the Igbo people of southeastern Nigeria.

== History ==
William Baikie the Scottish explorer, when exploring the Niger in the 1854 noted how Igbo chiefs would wear red caps

"They wore red caps, decorated with white and red feathers, which I found are only borne by warriors, each feather denoting an enemy slain in an actual war-fare. Some of our entertainers had as many as five or six,"

Nineteenth-century British army officer, and surgeon Africanus Horton, narrates how important men, or men in war wore a long cap with a feather on it, to signify someone they have killed in war.

"One distinguishing rank among the Egboes is the Odogo, or captain of war, of which there are several grades; the title is distinguished by the individual carrying on his cap a long feather which signifies that the wearer has killed in war a person of rank"

Mockler-Ferryman also noted in 1882, how the red cap was associated with being a chief, and how it is associated with power.

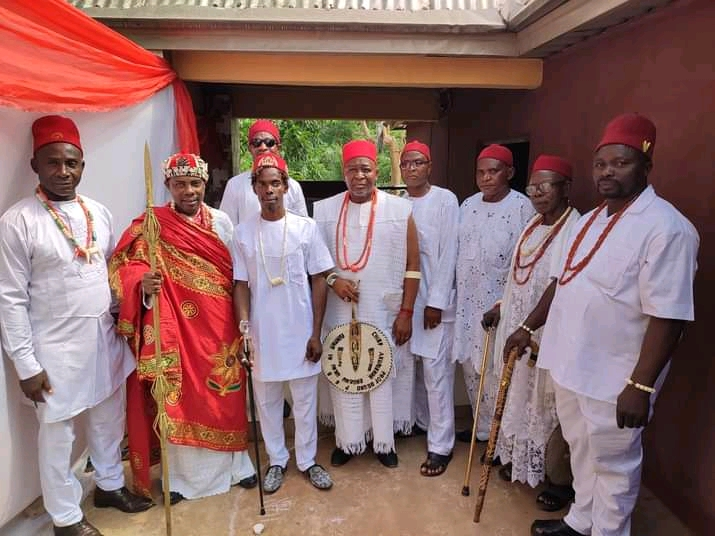
Igbo men with Okpu Ozo (Red cap)

== Modern Design ==
In the modern day, Igbo red caps are worn primarily by titled men, elders, chiefs, and respected community leaders, the red cap signifies wisdom, leadership, achievement, and the responsibility to uphold the customs and values of the community. Receiving the right to wear the red cap is often associated with attaining a traditional title or earning distinction through service and integrity.

== See also ==
- Akupe (handfan)
- Isiagu
- Igbo regalia and headdresses
- Okpu Agu

== Gallery ==
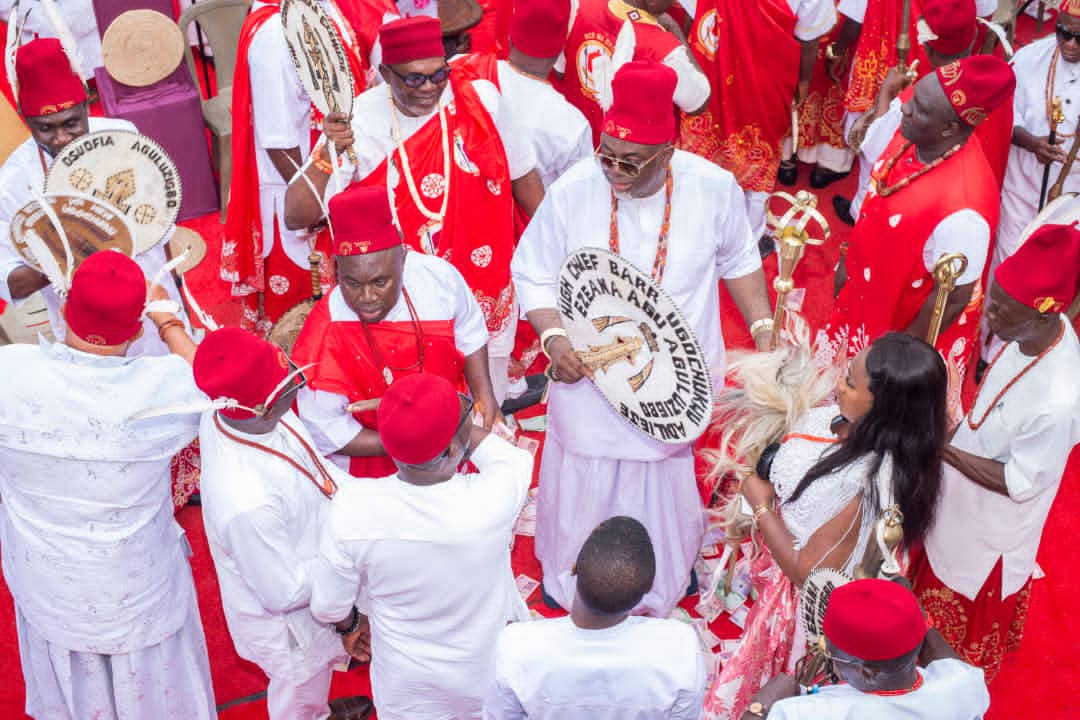

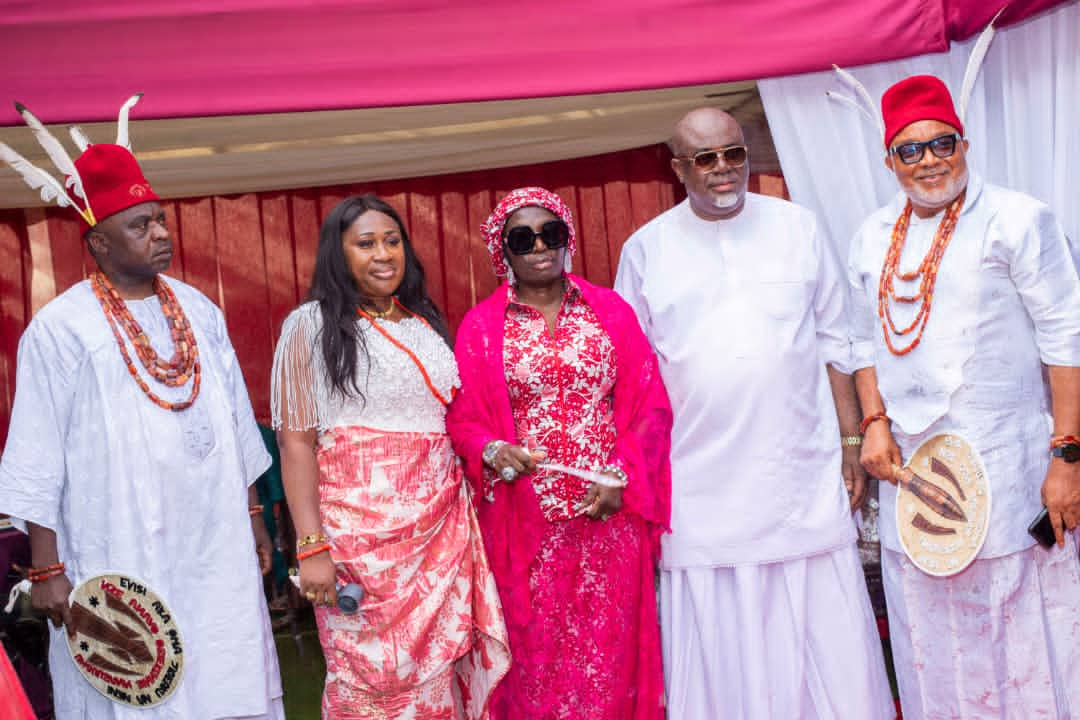

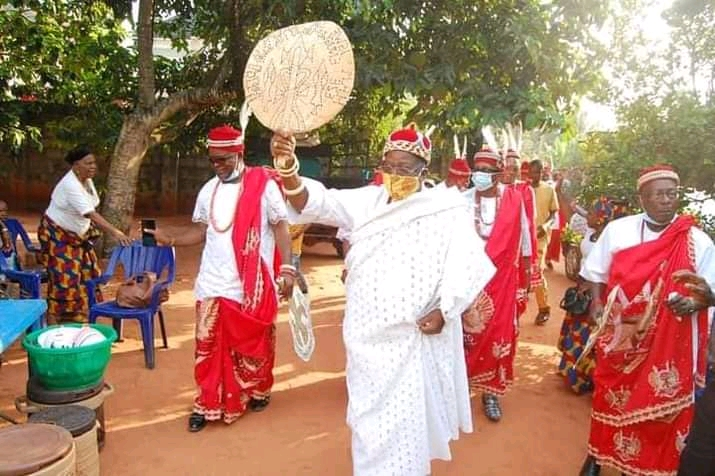
