= Isiagu =

Prestigious attire of the Igbo people

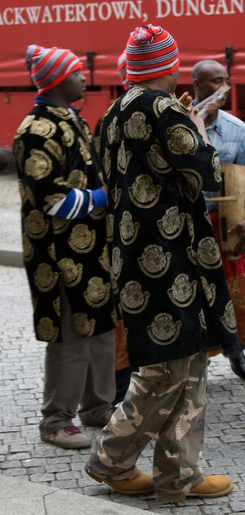
Men wearing the modern Isiagu with traditional Igbo men's hat.

The Isiagu (Leopard head in English), also called Chieftaincy, is a highly prestigious attire that is worn by the Igbo people which signifies power, authority, and pride. It holds a significant cultural and symbolic value for the Igbo people. It is usually worn on special occasions like weddings and coronation ceremonies. The shirt may be long or short sleeved. Some shirts have gold buttons that are linked by a chain. There is usually a breast pocket on the front. Traditionally, the Isiagu was given to a man when he received a chieftaincy title. The shirt is usually worn with a red hat called Okpu Ozo or the Igbo leopard cap. The leopard cap is known as Okpu Agu in the Igbo language.

== Gallery ==
Isiagu attire

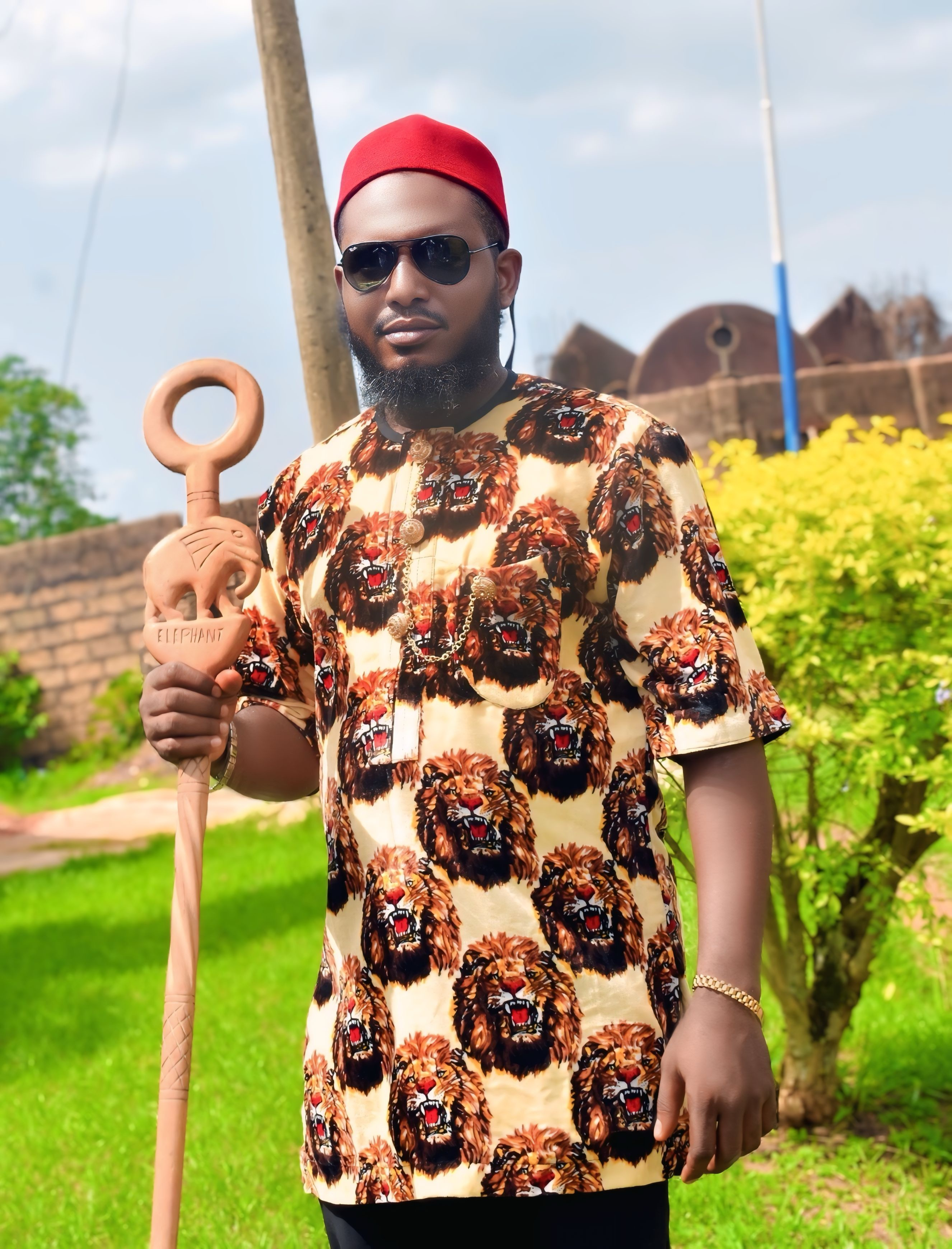

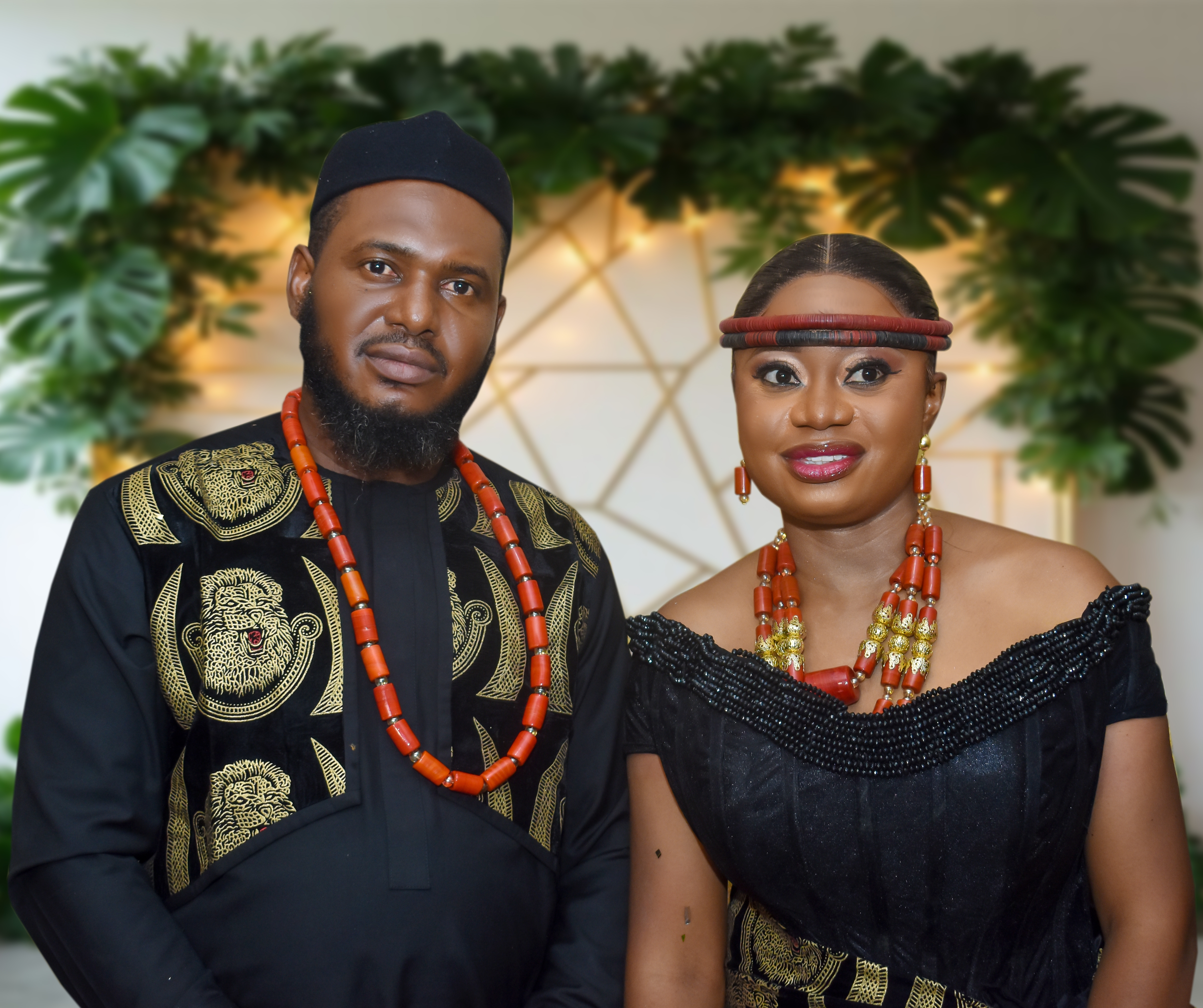

== See also ==
- Akupe (handfan)
- Okpu Ozo (red cap)
- Okpu Agu (leopard red cap)
- Igbo regalia and headdresses
- Igbo people
