= Rogers All Stars =

- Founded: 1970s
- Founder: Romanus Nwaementa Okonkwo
- Genre: highlife, jùjú, fuji
- Country of origin: Nigeria
- Location: Onitsha

Rogers All Stars is a Nigerian independent record label founded in the 1970s by Romanus Nwaementa Okonkwo, also known as Rogers. Its studio and production plant is located in Onitsha. Following Nigeria's oil boom in 1979, Rogers All Stars was one of the labels responsible for the substantial growth of record production in Nigeria, especially for musicians associated with the highlife genre of Nigerian pop music.

== History ==
Rogers All Stars was founded by Romanus Nwaementa Okonkwo. Okonkwo had previously worked with another Nigerian label, Right Time Records. During this time, Okonkwo would DJ weekend events at local schools with music from Right Time Records artists, as well as other highlife music and American country artists such as Skeeter Davis, Jim Reeves, and The Everly Brothers. Because of the label's use of branded Rogers International audio equipment, he became known as Rogers. After working with Right Time for seven years, he departed to form his own label. In order to avoid conflict with other labels or acts known as "All Stars", he prepended his old nickname.

In 1975, Prince Nico Mbarga signed with Rogers All Stars following his break from EMI, which had ceased production on his previous releases. Two years after EMI rejected a demo of his highlife track "Sweet Mother", Okonkwo heard Mbarga performing it at the Plaza Hotel in Onitsha with his band, Rocafil; Okonkwo proposed releasing it through his fledgling label. Following the single's successful release, Rogers All Stars sponsored a West African tour for Mbarga and his band. However, tensions emerged when Mbarga brought Okonkwo to court on suspicion that he was withholding royalties. Around this time, Rogers All Stars also signed Cameroonian musician Justin Tchatchoua. By 1979, Nigeria was experiencing an oil boom. This period of economic growth enabled Rogers All Stars and other Nigerian labels to produce millions of records annually.

Due to the popularity of Mbarga's recordings, his style of highlife music became what Black Music & Jazz describes as the "house style" for Rogers All Stars in the late 70s and early 80s. Okukuseku International Band of Ghana, led by Kofi Sammy, used a similar style, blending traditional Ghanaian rhythms and harmonies with two-tracked guitars, which had a more contemporary sound. However, some Rogers All Stars acts, such as Canadoes Super Stars Band Of Ghana, departed from Mbarga's formula, opting instead for a less westernized fuji music style.

In 2017, Okonkwo was involved in a petition to the Copyright Society of Nigeria (COSON) by an assembly of Nigerian music industry professionals. The assembly held COSON accountable for poor copyright regulation in Nigeria. Since the late 90s, poor copyright control has contributed to both declining revenues for independent Nigerian labels and also the movement of major international labels such as EMI and Sony out of the Nigerian market.

== Artists ==
Artists that are or have been signed to Rogers All Stars include:

- Bright Chimezie
- Ikenga Superstars of Africa
- Goddy Ezike & Black Brothers
- Prince Nico Mbarga and Rocafil
- Okukuseku International Band of Ghana
- Canadoes Super Stars Band Of Ghana
