= Prince Nico Mbarga =

Cameroonian-Nigerian highlife musician (1950–1997)

- Also known as: Prince Nico
- Born: Nico Mbarga; 1 January 1950
- Origin: Obubra, Cross River State, Nigeria
- Died: 23 June 1997 (aged 47)
- Genre: Highlife
- Occupations: Singer, songwriter, record producer
- Years active: 1970–1997
- Formerly of: Chief Osita Osadebe

Nico Mbarga (1 January 1950 – 23 June 1997), better known as Prince Nico Mbarga, was a Cameroonian-Nigerian highlife musician, born to a Nigerian mother from Mbembe Obubra LGA, Cross Rivers State and a Cameroonian father in Abakaliki, Nigeria. He is renowned for his hit song "Sweet Mother", recorded with his band Rocafil Jazz, which has been described as the best-selling song in history by an African recording artist.

== Early life ==
Mbarga grew up at Ikom, Cross River State with his Cameroonian father, a timber sawyer, and Nigerian mother, a peasant farmer. Much of his time was spent fishing by the river. While still a boy, his father inadvertently sparked his passion for highlife music when he brought home a secondhand Philips radio. Mbarga was captivated by the sounds of Bobby Benson's 'Taxi Driver'. From that moment on, highlife music became a part of his life. He spent hours listening to the radio, absorbing every beat. He knew he wanted to be part of it.

Mbarga's father came from a long line of xylophone players, and taught him the instrument. This was a handheld version with metal tines plucked by the thumbs. But Mbarga wanted to make a sound more like the western instruments of highlife, so he built his own xylophone from dried-out plantain skins and scooped bark.

Following his father's death from a sudden illness, life took a harsh turn. His mother struggled to make ends meet. To support his family, he started singing at bars, and often went unpaid.

During the 1967 Nigerian Civil War, he escaped to Mamfe, Cameroon, but his mother and sibling stayed back in Nigeria. There he met his first love, Lucy. There in Mamfe, he worked as a band boy for a Congolese group. Tasked with carrying instruments to concerts at local hotels. He came to learn and love the Congolese rumba which was accompanied by melodic guitar phrases. He was determined to learn. Thus, he self taught and mastered the conga drum, bass and Congolese style electric guitar finger picking.

After the three hard years of war came to an end, Mbarga looked to launch his career back in Nigeria. Lucy and Mbarga's first attempted border crossing failed. The couple was arrested and sent to prison for three days for not having passports. They then successfully made it across by going “the bush way” in 1970. They came to Onitsha, a trading town on the banks of the Niger River.

== Personal life ==
Mbarga was married to Esame Mbarga and was survived by 10 children; Nico, Descrow, Estelle, Slimphilz, Pauline, Joan, Lillian, Lucy, Lionel, and Nicoline. In 2011, Pauline, one of his children passed on following a brief illness making nine remaining children. Among the nine Mbarga's surviving children, only Nico, Descrow, Estelle and Slimphilz are actively involved in music and working to promote their late father's ‘panco' style of music. Joan, Lillian, Lucy, Lionel, and Nicoline are said to be either currently engaged in doing business or working white collar jobs at the Nigerian civil service commission.

== Music ==
He played the xylophone, conga, drums, bass guitar and electric guitar. He first started playing in school bands and he made his professional debut as a member of a hotel band, the Melody Orchestra, in 1970.

== Career ==
=== Early years ===
Although he only recorded one significant hit, "Sweet Mother," in 1976, which sold more than 13 million copies, Mbarga played an important role in the evolution of African popular music. With his soulful vocals set to the light melodies of his acoustic guitar, Mbarga created a unique hybrid of Nigerian and Congolese guitar playing and uplifting highlife rhythms. He formed his own group, Rocafil Jazz after the Nigerian civil war, to perform regularly at the Plaza Hotel in the eastern Nigerian city of Onitsha.

After releasing a disappointing single in 1973, Mbarga and Rocafil Jazz had their first success with their second single, "I No Go Marry My Papa", a regional hit. The band's inability to break past their local following resulted in their recording contract being dropped by EMI, a decision that proved ill-fortuned when the band signed with Rogers All Stars, a Nigerian recording company based in Onitsha, and recorded "Sweet Mother".

Sung in Pidgin, "Sweet Mother" became one of the top sellers in the history of Nigerian music. In the six years that Mbarga and Rocafil Jazz remained with Rogers All Stars, 1975 to 1981, they recorded nine albums.

=== Later years ===
On a repeat tour to England in 1982, Mbarga became known for his flamboyant, 1970s glam rock-inspired performances. While he continued to appear with Rocafil Jazz, Mbarga also performed with London-based highlife band the Ivory Coasters and former Rocafil Jazz member, Cameroonian vocalist Louisiana Tilda. Despite Mbarga launching his own Polydor-distributed record label, upon his return to Nigeria, he and the original members of Rocafil Jazz separated after some disagreements. Although he later formed the New Rocafil Jazz Band, Mbarga failed to match his early success. Leaving music, he turned his attention to managing the four-star hotel that he owned, the Sweet Mother Hotel, located in the town of Ikom in Cross River State Nigeria, just minutes away from the Cameroon-Nigeria border.

== Death ==
Prince Nico Mbarga died on his way to Ikom to see his mother in a motorcycle accident on 23 June 1997 in Calabar while trying to buy spare parts for his car along the ever busy Mayne Avenue Road, leaving behind "Sweet Mother" as the most popular song among Nigerians. "Sweet Mother" is sometimes called "Africa's anthem" and has been voted Africa's favourite song by BBC readers and listeners. His mother died shortly after learning of his death.

== Discography ==
=== Studio albums ===
- Sweet Mother (1976)
- Prince Nico Mbarga & Rocafil Jazz (1976)
- Rocafil Jazz 76 (1976)
- Prince Nico Mbarga & Rocafil Jazz (1977)
- Free Education in Nigeria (1977)
- Family Movement (1978)
- Rockafil Jazz & Nicholas Mbaraga (1978)
- Prince Nico Mbarga & Rocafil Jazz (1978)
- Cool Money (1979)
- Experience 001 (1979)
- Lucky Marriage! (1980)
- No Die, No Rest (1980)
- Music Message (1981)
- Let Them Say (1982)
- Papal Visit (1982)
- Chameleon (1984)
- Panco Juju System (1986)
- Sweet Family (1987)
- Only One God (1989)
