= Igbo regalia and headdresses =

Clothing associated with the Igbo people

Igbo regalia and headdresses comprise the ceremonial headgear, hairstyles, adornments, accessories, clothing and insignia traditionally associated with the Igbo people. These include the ịchafu (head ties), aka (beads), ola aka (bangles), helmet and okpu (caps), Other significant headdresses and regalia include: akupe (hand fans), nza (fly-whisks), odu (Ivory ), ofo, nkpara (staffs ), ugo (eagle's feathers), wigs and other symbolic objects used to express cultural identity, social status, title, spiritual significance and ceremonial functions.

Many forms of Igbo regalia are associated with rulers, chiefs (Ndị Nze), and titled individuals. They are used to mark rank, status, office and authority, and remain an important part of Igbo cultural traditions.

Archeological excavations at Igbo-Ukwu by Charles Thurstan Shaw uncovered 9th-century burials containing ceremonial regalia, including beads, Headdresses, crowns, fly-whisks, anklets, and other prestige objects.

== Ichafu isi head-dress ==
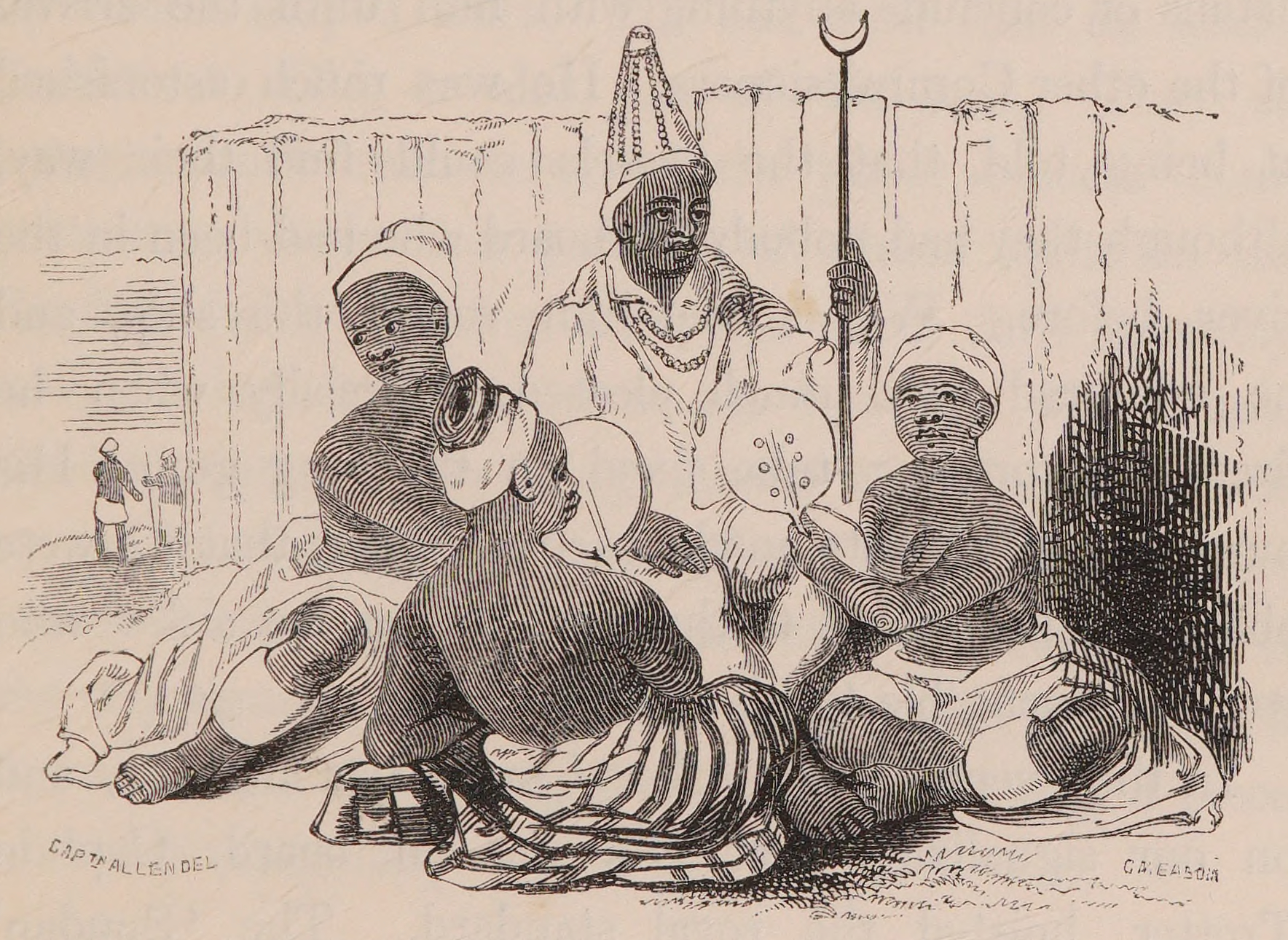
Igbo women described by William Allen in his 1841 book as Eze Obi's wives. The image depicts them wearing headcloths known as Ichafu among the Igbo, and elephant ivory anklets known as odu. They carry Akupe (handfans) while the Obi carries a staff known as nkpara mmuo

Ichafu (also recorded as Ichafo and Icafo in historical sources) is a headcloth or headgear, defined by Edith E. Mellie as a flat piece of cloth (six by three feet) folded conveniently either in a triangle or in a rectangle and wrapped around the head to form a tall turban-like headdress with a bow. According to Mellie, "In the Nigerian context, a headgear is differentiated from the head tie which is smaller (about one square yard or less and tied flat on the head)."

Headcloths (ichafu) have long been a part of Igbo women's clothing ensemble. The anthropologist M.M. Green documented Igbo women in 1947 wearing festive headcloths to market and observed that headcloths were commonly worn at meetings and social gatherings as part of their clothing ensemble. Buchi Emecheta in her autobiography, Head above Water, mentions her brother wanting to buy ichafo siliki, silk headties for his coming of age dance.

Writing about her experiences in Igboland, Rhoda Cowen described a big Ichafu head-tie worn by a woman as a bright coloured cloth wound round with ends sticking boldly out as well as worn in a bold and stylish manner by the women for church services.

In an essay on personal style, Chimamanda Ngozi Adichie describes watching her mother arrange her Ichafu by folding, pinning and twisting it "until it sat on her head like a large flower".

Ichafu has also appeared in contemporary educational and fashion contexts. It has been described as a ceremonial headscarf worn for weddings in educational material on textiles and cultural signs. In 2025, The Observer reported that Priya Ahluwalia's Spring/Summer 2026 collection drew inspiration from Nigerian Ichafu headwraps, incorporating the headwear into jacquard knit designs alongside Bollywood motifs.

== Helmet coiffures and beaded crowns ==
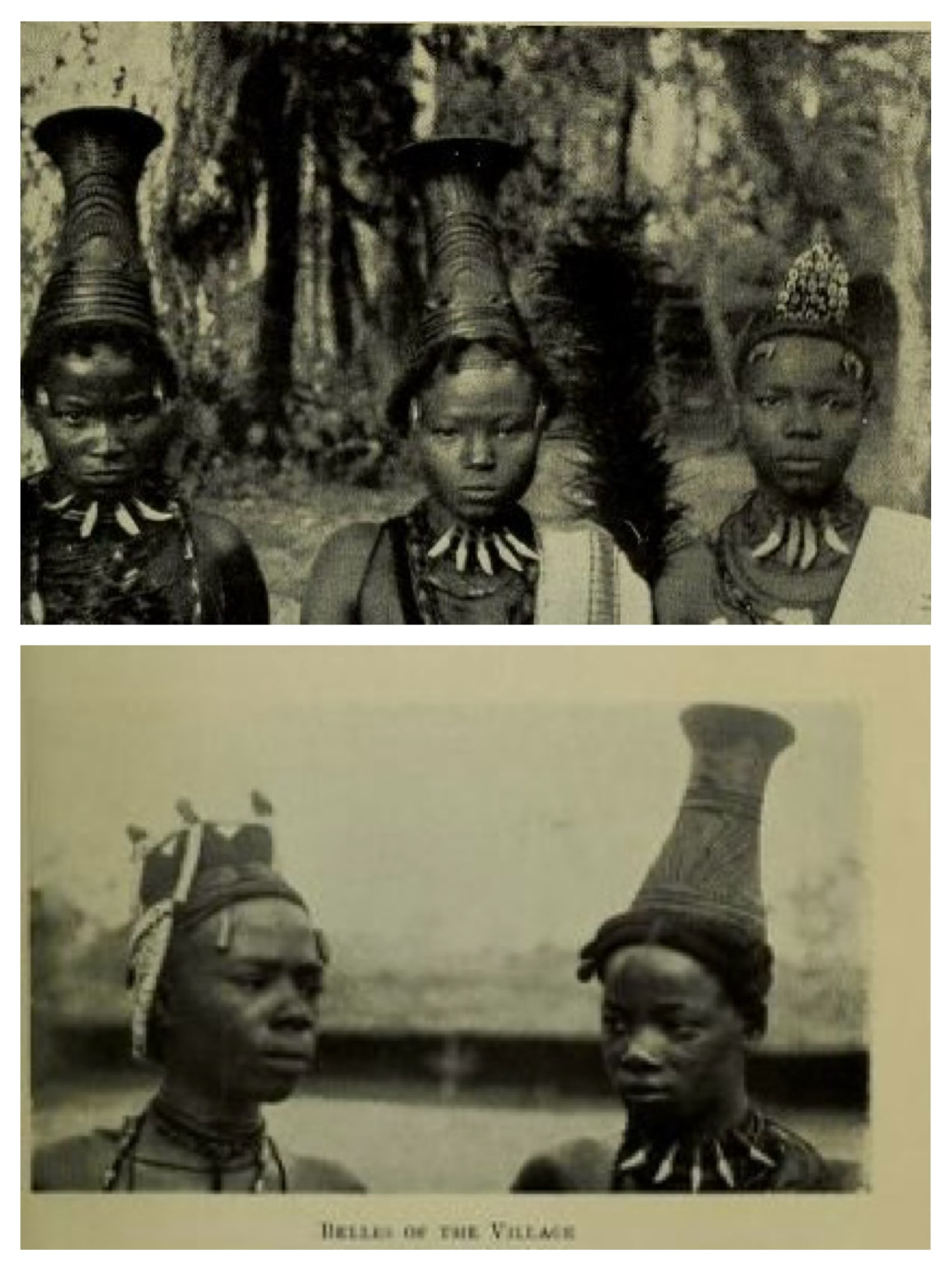
Ethnographic photos of Igbo brides known as Nkpu brides of prospective chiefs dressed in helmet Coiffures and heagears, necklaces of Leapard teeth and aggry beads 1920.

Igbo headdresses also include elaborate female head adornments, as well as decorative headgear featuring elaborate coiffures worn by masquerades such as the Agbogho Mmuo (maiden spirit) during festivals and cultural events. The Headdresses and costumes are intended to depict female figures and their feminine appearance and attributes.

Helmet-shaped coiffures were among the elaborate hairstyles historically worn by Igbo women during courtship, marriage festivities, and other ceremonial occasions. Some were built on a foundation of clay, charcoal and palm oil and moulded into a crest resembling the central ridge of a Roman helmet, extending from the forehead to the nape of the neck. The coiffures were often further decorated with beads, small could plaits, cowry shells, mother-of-pearl, brass ornaments, and mirrors sewn into the hair.

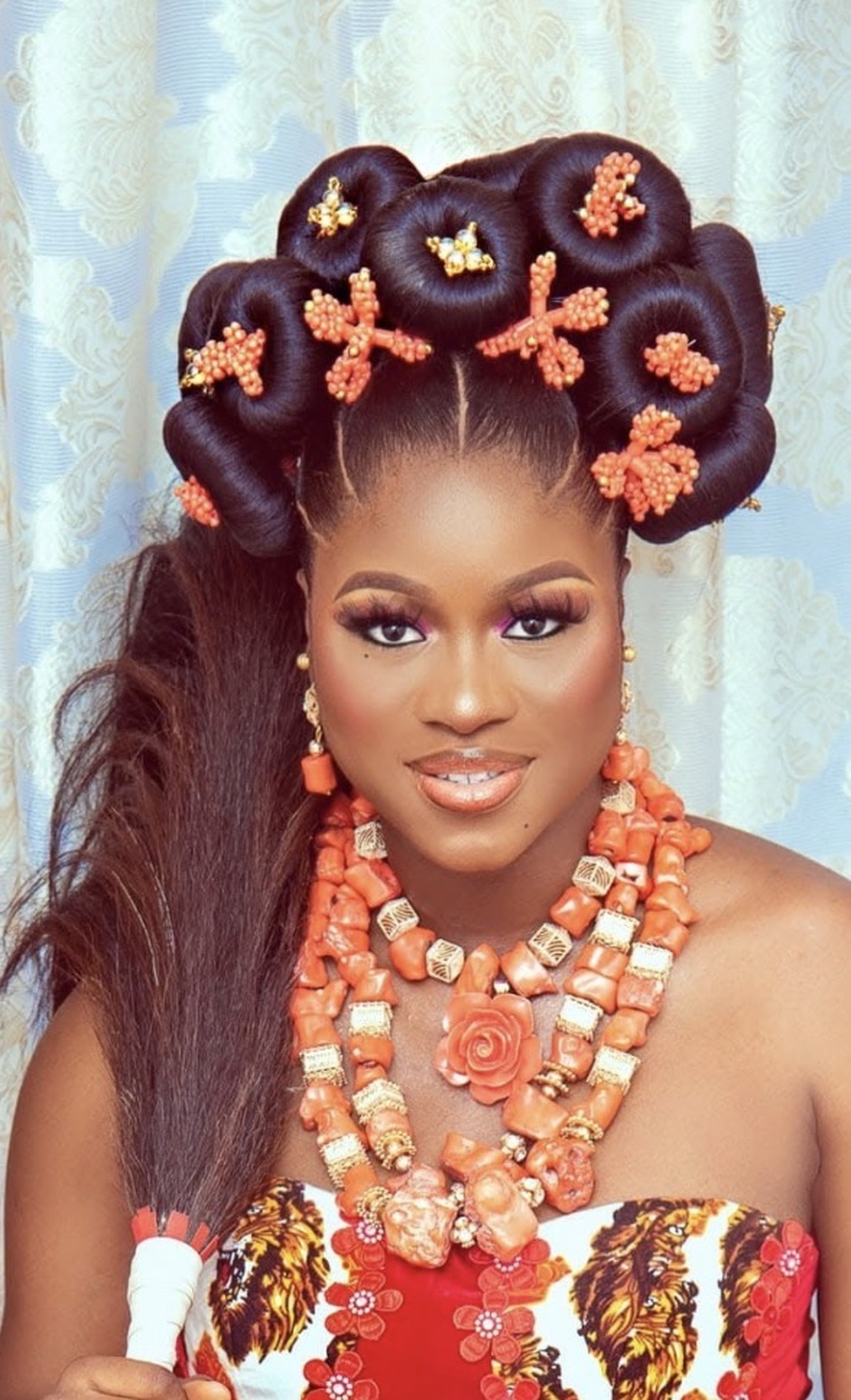
Igbo woman adorned in beadded headdress, aka (coral beads) worn around the neck and the ears and a hand-held fly-whisk

Other recorded styles include a raised helmet-like ridge formed on a clay foundation and decorated with beads, cowry shells, leopard claws, camwood paste, and other adornments. Such coiffures could signify age, status, wealth or other stages of life and formed part of ceremonial female adornment in parts of Igboland.

While elaborate Helmet-shaped coiffures were a prominent part of historical Igbo women's ceremonial adornment, contemporary ceremonial attire incorporates beaded crowns and bead-based headpieces. Studies of present-day Igbo dress culture depict the brides and her maidens wearing beaded crowns as part of the traditional attire, or decorate their hair with bead accessories during weddings and Cultural celebrations. Beaded crowns, together with corals and other ornamental beads remain a prominent feature of Igbo regalia and are associated with beauty, femininity, cultural identity, fertility, spiritual well-being and marital blessings.

== Aka ==
Beaded accessories made of glass beads are known as aka among the Igbo people. They're of various types which consist of coral beads known as erulu or aka and waist beads known as mgbaji. The large coral beads are known as nkalari. The mgbaji is usually a kind of flat circular coral beads worn around the waist. The large coral beads are worn around the neck, and also worn as earrings and on the wrists. Aka is an important part of both Igbo men's and Women's dress fashion. Among the men, it is also regarded as a status symbol across Africa and a ceremonial adornment like bridal attire for Igbo women. Gold beads are also incorporated in the dress attire.

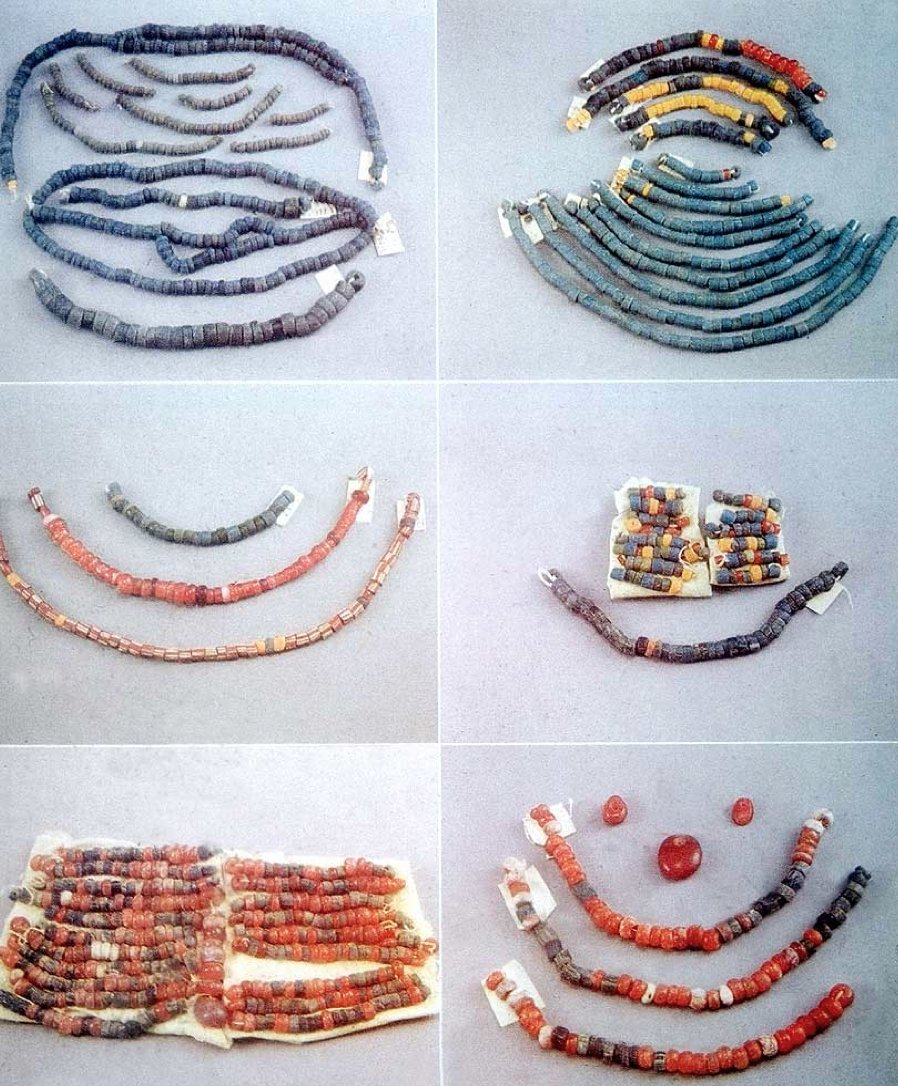
9th Century carbon-dated Igbo-ukwu glass beads.

Beads are highly valued in Igboland and have long been an important part of Igbo ceremonial dress and adornment. Excavations at Igbo-ukwu uncovered large quantities of glass and carnelian beads used in necklaces, armlets, wristlets, girdles, and other ornaments. In one royal burial, hundreds of beads were found around the skull, which suggests that the deceased wore a beaded headdress, while strings of beads and a copper crown was part of the ceremonial regalia. These discoveries dated as early as the 9th century by Thurstan Shaw show that beaded accessories was widely used as a regalia symbol and adornment in ancient Igbo society.

== Odu aka (Wristlet and Armlet) ==
Odu aka also known as mgba aka refers to wristlets and armlets in Igbo language. They are ornaments worn as part of Igbo ceremonial regalia and are associated with authority, prestige and ritual status and festivities. Shaw recorded that the regalia of the Eze Nri included ivory wristlets alongside a staff, an ofo, an elephant-tusk horn, a crown of fish-eagle feathers, a necklace of leopard's teeth, bells and a pectoral mask.

Excavations at the ninth-century Igbo-Ukwu sites uncovered numerous wristlets and armlets made of copper and bronze. They were produced in several distinct forms, including plain, twisted, overlapping and knotted designs. Many were fashioned from bent or twisted metal rods, while others were ornamented with engraved grooves, punched dots, concentric circles, lozenge motifs, raised pellets and herringbone designs. Some examples have expanded terminals, overlapping ends or decorative knots created by twisting the metal. Wristlets formed part of the royal burial assemblage at Igbo-Ukwu and were recovered with other items of ceremonial regalia.

Finely made copper armlets, including examples decorated with hundreds of blue glass beads were also unearthed. Shaw recorded that the regalia of the Eze Nri included ivory wristlets, while the Igbo-Ukwu discoveries show that metal armlets also formed part of ceremonial dress.

The armlets from Igbo-Ukwu were made from copper rings joined by fine copper wire to form upright ribs. Glass beads were threaded onto thin wires stretched between the ribs, creating rows of closely packed beads that covered the surface of the armlet. Some examples contained nearly one thousand beads arranged in vertical panels. The armlets were recovered from the royal burial chamber together with other ceremonial objects, reflecting the high level of craftsmanship achieved by Igbo metalworkers in the ninth century. A type of armlets and wristlets made of ivory are a prominent regalia of otu odu women; an ivory association of Igbo women.

== Odu ukwu (Anklets) ==
Odu úkwù refers to anklets in Igbo language. They are an important part of Igbo ceremonial regalia and are worn as symbols of authority, prestige and ritual status. Shaw recorded that the regalia of the Eze Nri included copper anklets together with a staff, an ofo, an elephant-tusk horn, a crown of fish-eagle feathers, a necklace of leopard's teeth, bells, and a pectoral mask.

Many copper and bronze anklets were found during the excavation of the ninth-century Igbo-Ukwu sites. They include simple rings, anklets with overlapping ends, twisted designs and interlocking forms. Some are plain, while others are decorated with lines, dots and other geometric patterns. They were made by bending, twisting and shaping metal into different forms. Anklets were among the ceremonial objects placed in the royal burial at Igbo-Ukwu. Ivory anklets are also a prominent regalia of Otu odu women

== Mgba-aka ==
Mgba aka or mgba nkpisi aka refers to finger rings in Igbo language. They are worn as personal ornaments and are also used as ceremonial regalia in Igbo culture.

Finger rings were found at the Igbo-Ukwu archaeological sites. They were made mainly of copper and bronze and included both plain and decorated examples. Some were made from twisted or overlapping wire, while others were cast from metal. Decorations included incised lines, rows of punched dots, concentric circles and other geometric designs. The rings varied in size, shape and method of manufacture. They were found together with crowns, staffs, anklets, wristlets, armlets, beads and other objects in the burial.

== Okpu ==
Okpu refers to traditional caps or helmets used by Igbo adult males of various statuses and ranks in the society for symbolic purposes. There are different kinds of Okpu worn by adult males in Igboland. The most prominent are feathered red cap known as okpu ozo and leopard cap known as Okpu agu.

=== Okpu Ozo ===
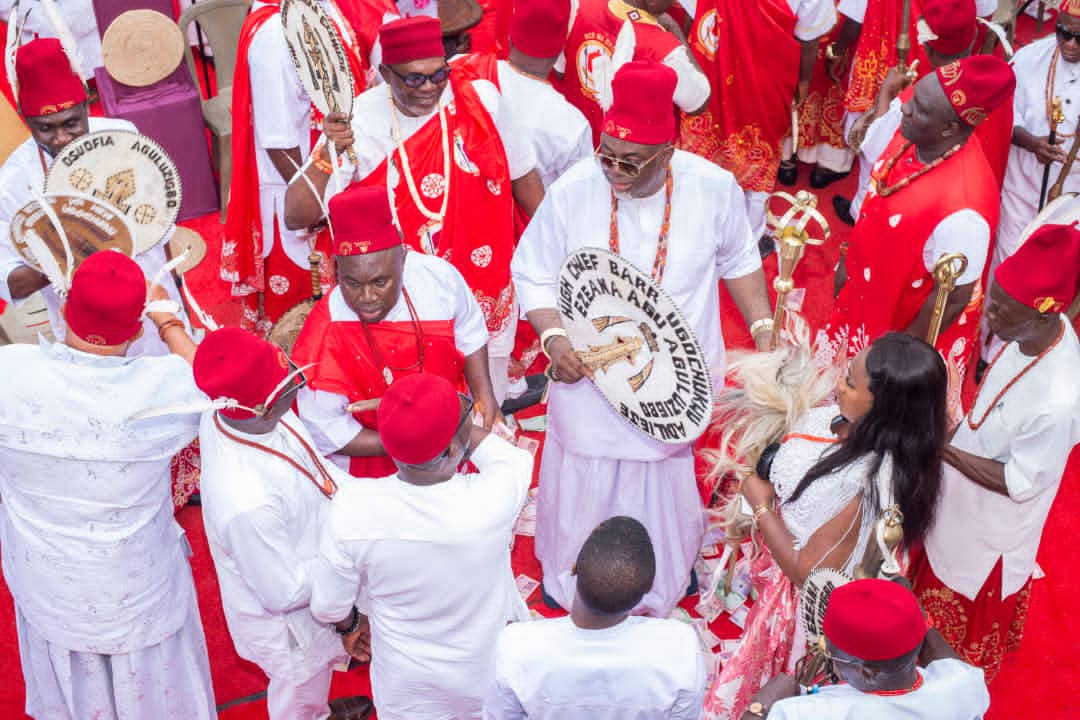
Titled Igbo men known as Ndi Nze na ozo wearing their traditional regalia featuring Okpu ozo (red caps made of hide with eagle's feathers). Their attire also features other Igbo regalia insignia such as Akupe, ofo, nza, nkpara

Okpu ozo is described as the feathered red cap worn by titled men known as Ndi Nze na Ozo. As a paraphernalia of office, okpu is regarded as sacred thereby prohibiting ordinary people from touching them. It is a high-crowned red cap made of hide and usually encircled with eight eagle feather plumes called ugo.This is particularly worn by the title holders called Nze. It can also be modest or low-crowned without the feather decorations worn by the Ozo title holders. It is also known as Okpu mmee mmee which literally translates to colour of the cap and okpu mmee which signifies true loyalty. Some Igbo regions also refer to it as okpu eze.

Okpu ozo is regarded as an insignia that protects the wearer when he was away from his lineage or village as well as other travellers. The wearers are known as Ndi nze na ozo or red cap chiefs. To obtain the title, a candidate traditionally applied to the red cap chiefs, who supervised the initiation ceremony. During the capping ceremony, the initiate was presented with a red cap and feather as a symbol of his new status and a symbol of authority to enable him perform his duties. This capping stage is also known as ikube-okpu. He also receives other insignia.

=== Okpu Agu ===
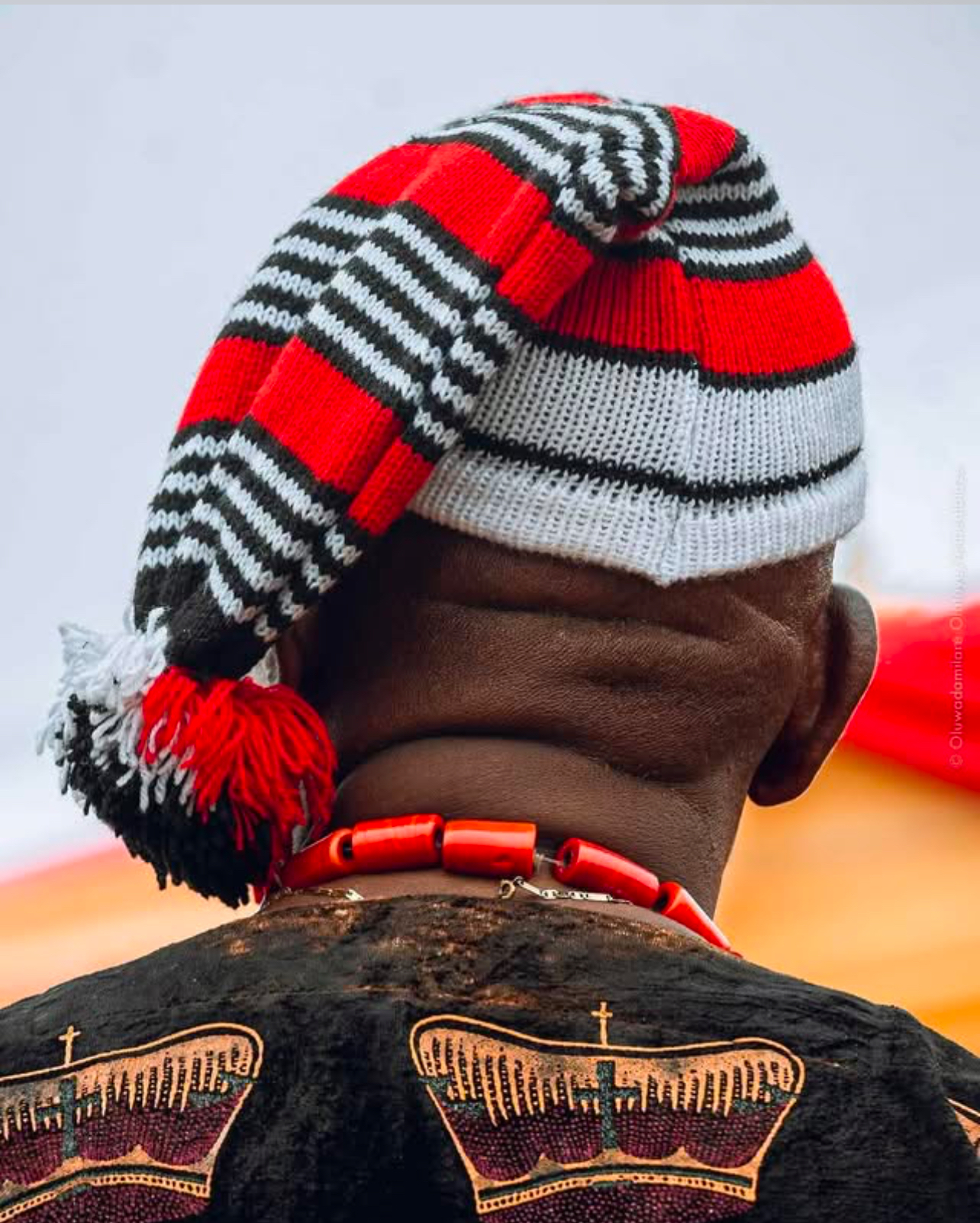
Man wearing okpu agu

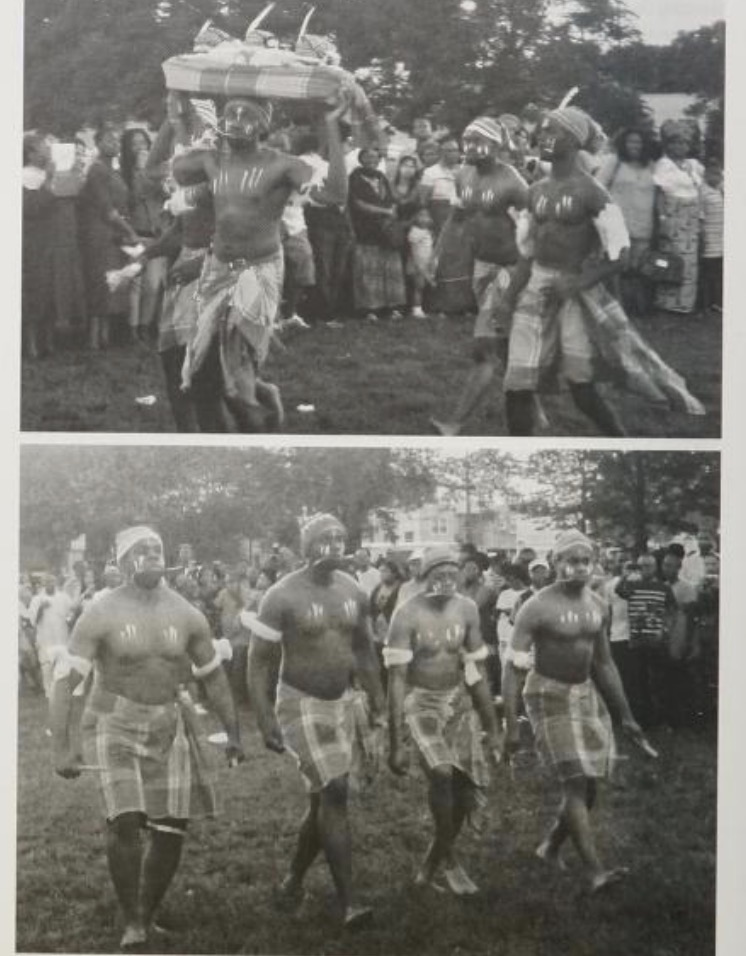
Ohafia Igbo dance performance in Chicago United States featuring the Okpu agu Igbo regalia

Some descriptions of Igbo headdresses highlight that three kinds of helmets were worn: thick ones made of coco-yam stalks, or of the bark of the Achi tree, and fine looking but thin ones made of young palm leaves or raffia hats called okpu uturu. Among these headgears was the okpu agu, a cap associated with Ohafia warrior traditions, known as the leopard cap of bravery. It is round slanting cap made of a knitted wool of black, white and red stripes with a pattern that resemble leopard markings from which the cap derives itnams name

The okpu agu was an important symbol of warrior achievement in Ohafia. According to historical accounts, the red colour of the cap was traditionally reserved for warriors who had taken heads in battle, or returned with the slain body of a strong animal like the leopard and the caps were dyed with the blood of war victims, while the black and white stripe evoked the leopard and its qualities of strength, agility and martial prowess that were admired in accomplished warriors, as well as the leopard body movement that characterizes the Ohafia War Dance movement.

Okpu agu was manufactured locally by process of bending over, tying and sowing. It is also known as Okpu-Aji by Nkanu Igbo people and Okpu Ojji by Abajah and Okpu oggu (fighting war caps)

=== Okpu-eze ===
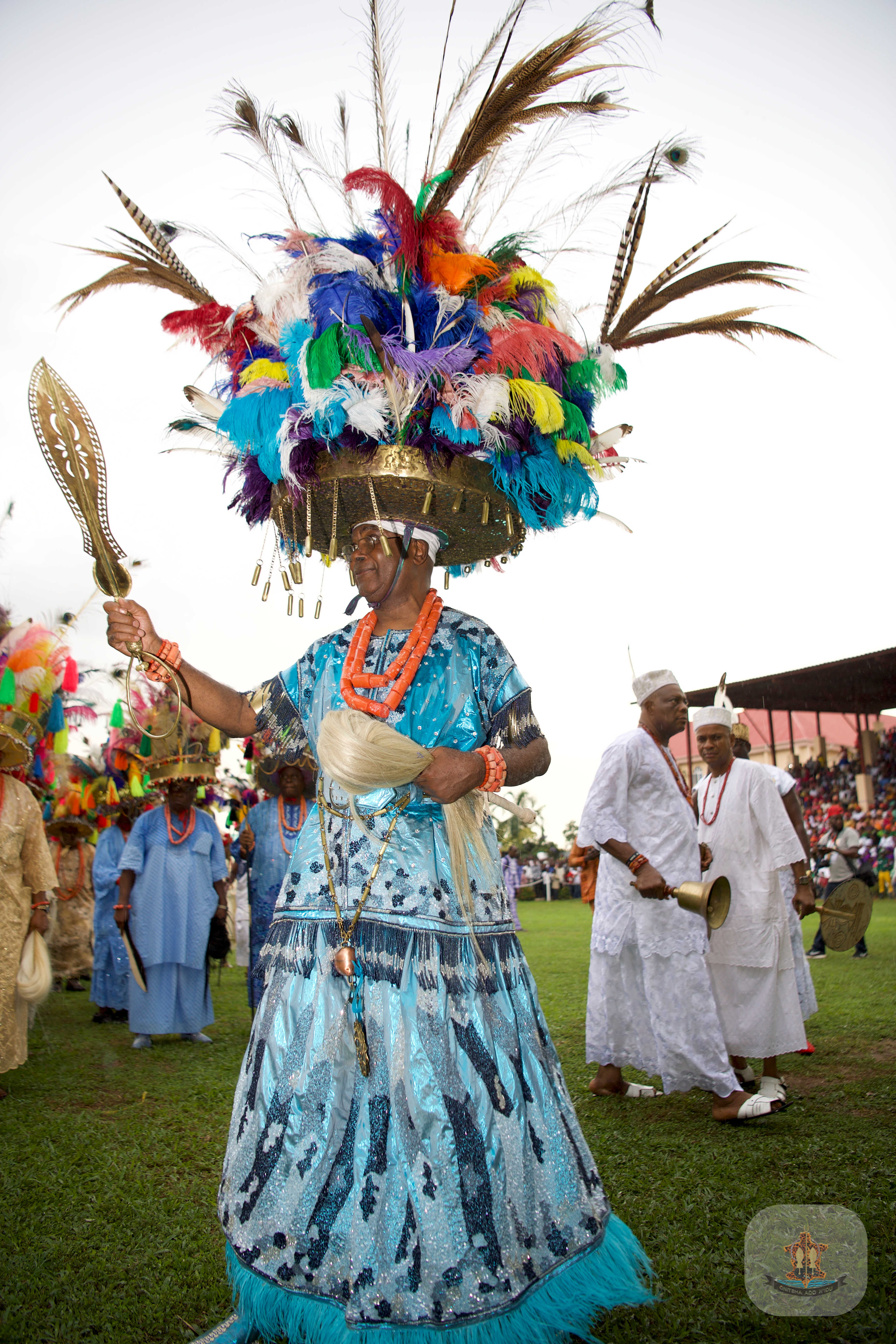
Obi of Onitsha wearing a ceremonial okpu-eze (crown)

Okpu-eze refers to crown in Igbo language. It is also known as opune-isi. Crowns form part of the ceremonial regalia of traditional Igbo rulers. During the coronation of an Eze, the ruler is crowned with a cowhide cap decorated with ugo (African fish eagle) feathers. The crown is worn with other ceremonial regalia and is also used in burial rites.

The Igbo-Ukwu excavations uncovered a crown, probably made of copper, in the burial chamber at Igbo Richard. It was found broken into two halves beside an elephant tusk. Each half is about 23 cm long and has a serrated upper edge with eight large points in the centre and fifteen smaller points along the sides. Below the serrated edge are two crescent-shaped projections, rows of lozenge-shaped holes and lines of punched decoration. The lower band has six pairs of attachment holes surrounded by a grooved interlace pattern, while the reverse is plain. Three thin copper plates, one decorated rectangular plate and two decorated roundels were found with the crown. The rectangular plate is decorated with rows of concentric semicircles, an interlace pattern and a central geometric or stylised animal design made with fine punched dots. The roundels are decorated with radiating punch-grooved lines, an interlace border and pairs of attachment holes. The attachment holes suggest that the crown and associated plates were fastened to a backing of leather or cloth, and that the crown was worn as a metal band passing over the top of the head from ear to ear rather than around the forehead.

The crown formed part of a larger group of ceremonial regalia recovered from the burial chamber. These included a copper pectoral plate, copper anklets, strings of beads, beaded wristlets, copper bosses, a copper fan-holder, a large calabash with a copper handle, elephant tusks and a bronze leopard skull mounted on a copper rod. The burial was reconstructed as showing the deceased seated on a wooden stool wearing the crown, pectoral plate, anklets and beadwork, and holding a ceremonial fly-whisk. The fly-whisk may have been held in one hand or placed upright in the ground beside the body, in the same way as the copper rod supporting the bronze leopard skull.

Shaw compared the burial with later descriptions of the Eze Nri. He noted similarities in the ceremonial regalia and burial customs, including the crown, pectoral ornament, anklets, stool, elephant tusks, staff, and fly-whisk, while also pointing out important differences.

== Akupe (hand fan) ==
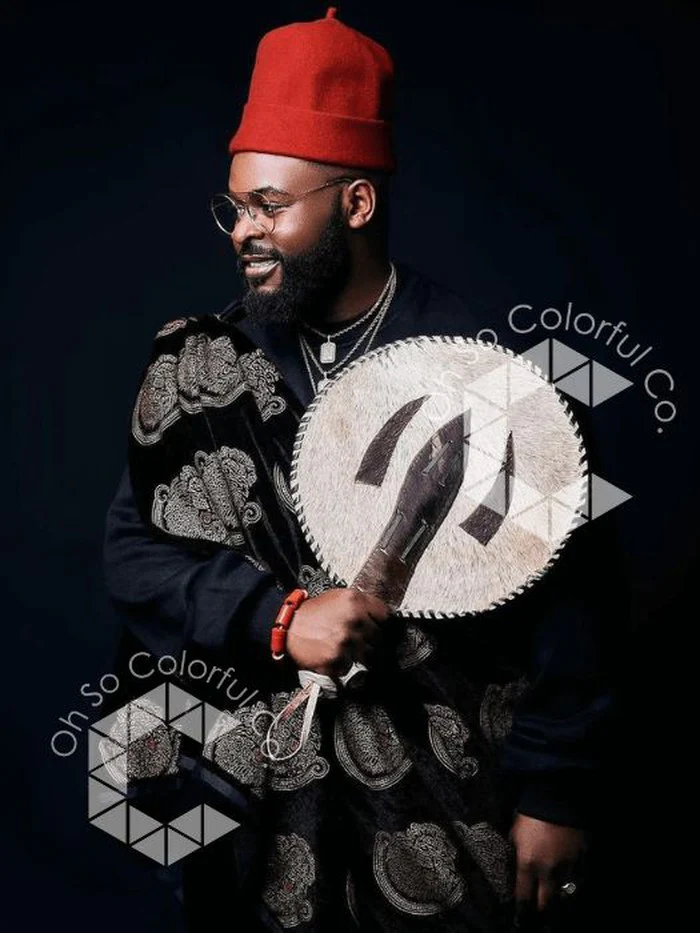
Man carrying an Akupe with ivory tusk symbol carved on it. The image also features him wearing Okpu Ozo and Isiagu flowing shirt and aka (coral beads) worn around his wrist.

Akupe is a ceremonial traditional handfan of the Igbo people which forms part of the clothing ensemble of Igbo men and women. However, it isn't merely used as a fashion complement but functions as both a practical object and insignia or symbol of status within Igbo society. It is mainly made of raw leather but was also made of other materials like straw, palm products and copper historically. As a paraphernalia of office, it is mainly associated with the Nze na ozo title holders.

The use of akupe as a ceremonial regalia in Igbo land dates back to Igbo-ukwu archeology where copper hand fan with a handle made of wooden shaft along with other status symbols were unearthed from a royal burial chamber of whom was described by Thurstan Shaw as a high ranking titled man or royalty. These excavations which included the fan was dated 9th century

- Akupe as a ceremonial regalia and Fashion among the men

The Akupe serves as both a ceremonial insignia and an element of elite male in Igbo Society. It is part of the regalia of titled men like the Ozo title holders, chiefs. and elders. Typically carried at the hand, it complements other symbols of status such as the Okpu, nkpara, nza or odu enyi and the traditional flowing shirt known as Isiagu,Akwete or Akwa ocha. Although it is made of various materials, the titled men specifically use raw leather made handfans which is either called Akupe or agu Other names generally used to refer to the ceremonial fan is nkuku and nzuzu especially among the Agbalanze titled group of Onitsha. The Akupe is designed and decorated in various ways but particularly in a thick and heavy pattern for the titled men. Their titles or names are written or carved at the surface of the handfans while their vehicle plate numbers are also designed as such for identification.

The fan is not merely acquired by titled men but bestowed on them during the capping ceremony where candidates are installed as Nze no ozo title holders or red cap chiefs. The final stage of the ceremony involves handing the candidate the Okpu nze na ozo and the Ugo feather, a fan and a sword among other insignia.

Akupe also serves as a ritual symbol in the Igbo mmanwu (masquerade) tradition, particularly in the cultural ceremony known as the Ijele dance where a significant personality among the dance group is known as Akupe carrier. While he is not a masquerade, he plays the prominent role of leading the Ijele with its symbolic powerful Akupe. The disappearance of either the Akupe or its bearer is believed to place the Ijele at risk. The Akupe bearer determines the movement of the Ijele, which moves or remains stationary according to the bearer's actions

- Akupe as a ceremonial regalia and fashion among the women

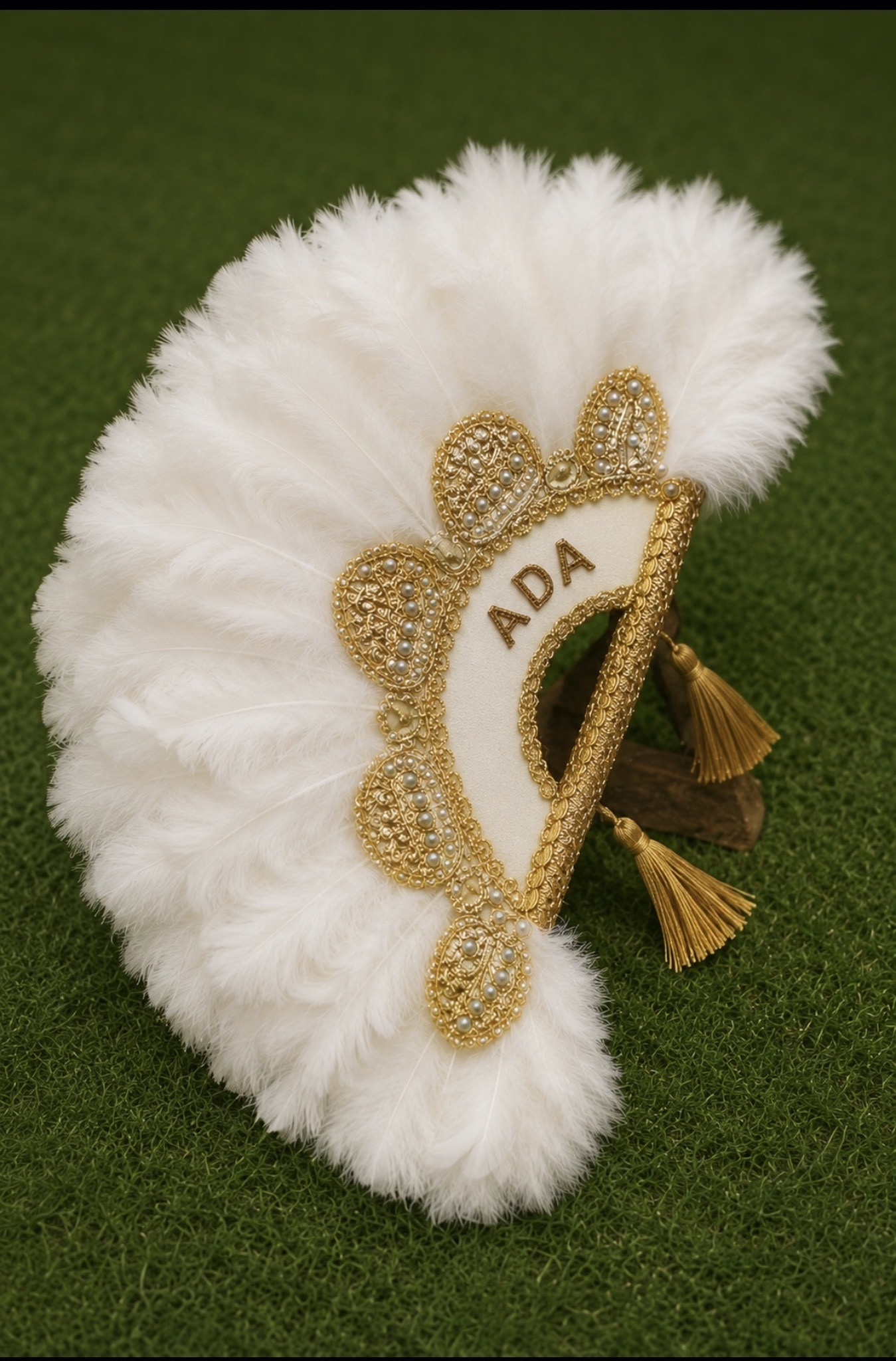
Bridal Akupe

In Igbo society, both large hand fans and artistic hand-held fans have traditionally formed part of women's ceremonial presentation, particularly during weddings, festivals or public celebrations. Historical accounts of Igbo marriage and courtship customs as early as 1921, describe Igbo brides and her maids of honour carrying large fans during the marriage ceremony, particularly the Nkpu rite to cool and keep the bride refreshed after dancing during the ceremony

In Igbo dances and performance traditions, artistic hand-held fans are used for aesthetics and symbolic purposes where they form part of the ceremonial ensemble

== Fly-whisks (Nza, Odu ebule) ==
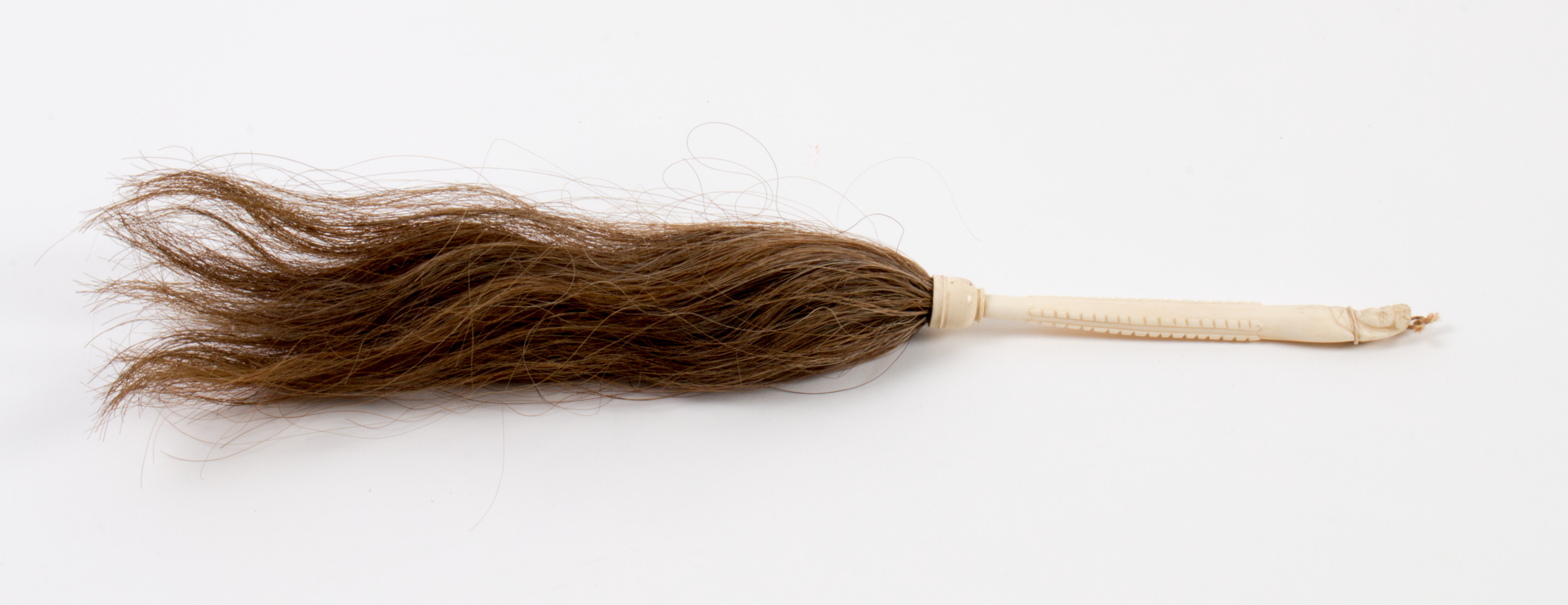
Fly-whisk (Nza or Odu ebule)

Fly-whisks are known as Nza or odu ebule among the Igbo people. It is a traditional ceremonial accessory and symbol of distinction in Igbo society. It forms part of the regalia of titled men, chiefs, elders, and other person's of rank also integrated into the attire which includes the akupe, headgear, staff among others. Historical accounts of title taking ceremonies describe newly initiated titled men receiving ceremonial objects as part of their elevation into positions of honour and responsibility within the community such as the Ozo title.

Archeological evidence from Igbo-ukwu, dating to about the 9th century, shows the antiquity flywhisks within Igbo ceremonial culture. The excavations that uncovered a royal burial furnished with elaborate regalia and the reconstructions of the chamber depicted the high ranking individual holding a ceremonial fly-whisk among other insignia of authority. These regalia have been interpreted in studies as markets of prestige, rank, leadership, royalty, and ritual symbolisms in early Igboland.

Beyond functioning as an insignia among titled men, royalty and chiefs, fly-whisks and related descriptions of the regalia has been recorded as forming part of the attire of Igbo dancers and brides during festivities or ceremonies like dance performances and traditional marriage. According to Basden in 1921, Nkpu brides during their marriage ceremony carried cow's tail mounted on a leather handle, sometimes accompanied by small mirrors placed in specially carved hand held frames, including large fans which all formed part of their attire in the ceremony.

Odu enyi is also used in artistic and performance traditions of the Igbo people like the nkpokiti dance. Studies of Igbo oral poetry includes the fly-whisks among the symbolic paraphernalia carried by performers as emblems of their artistry. The flywhisks were described as part of the ceremonial props employed in dances, processions, and choral performance where they serve both symbolic and aesthetic functions as they express the Igbo culture.

== Ofo ==
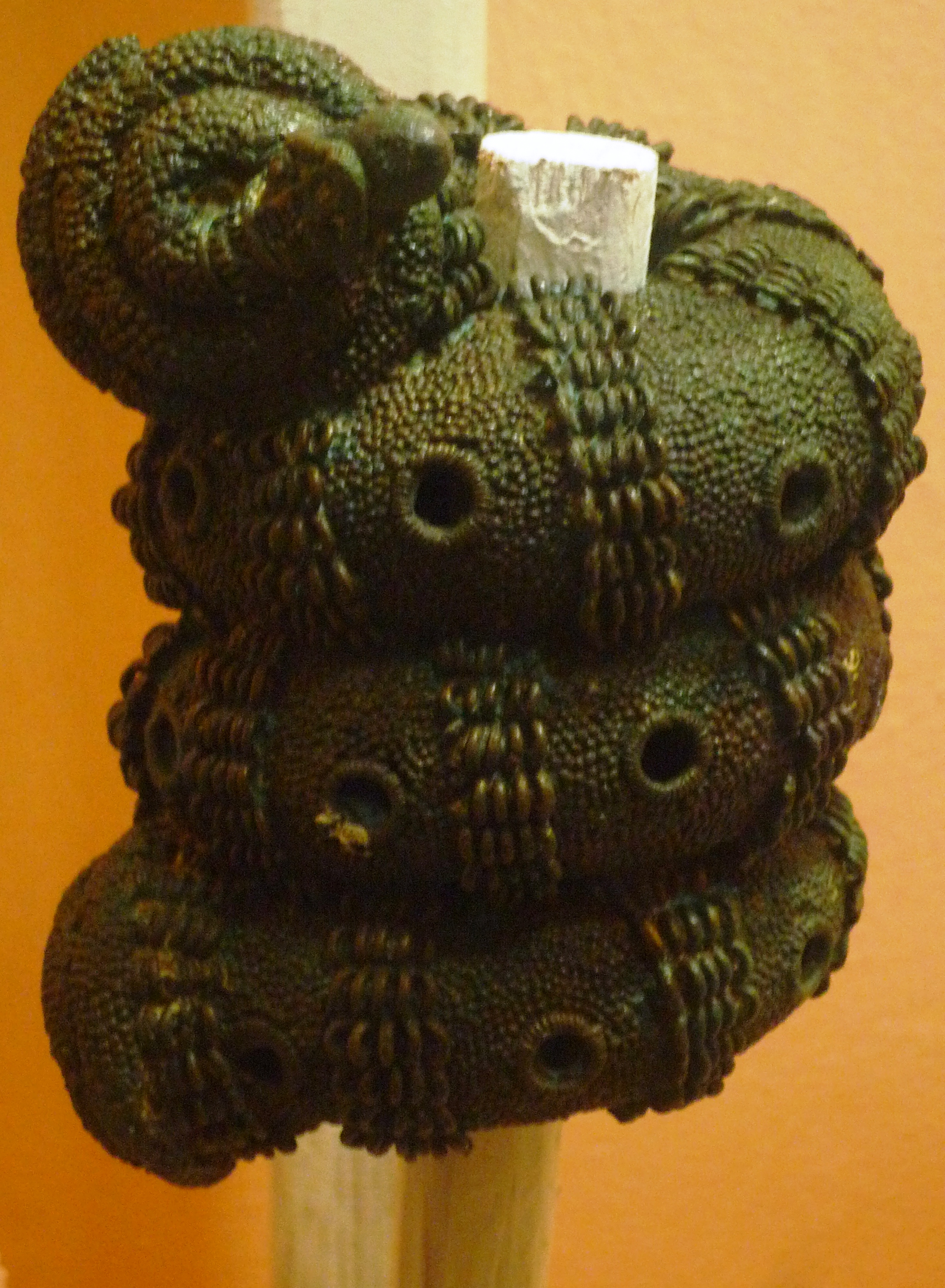
Bronze ornamented staff head uncovered at the 9th century dated Igbo-ukwu sotes

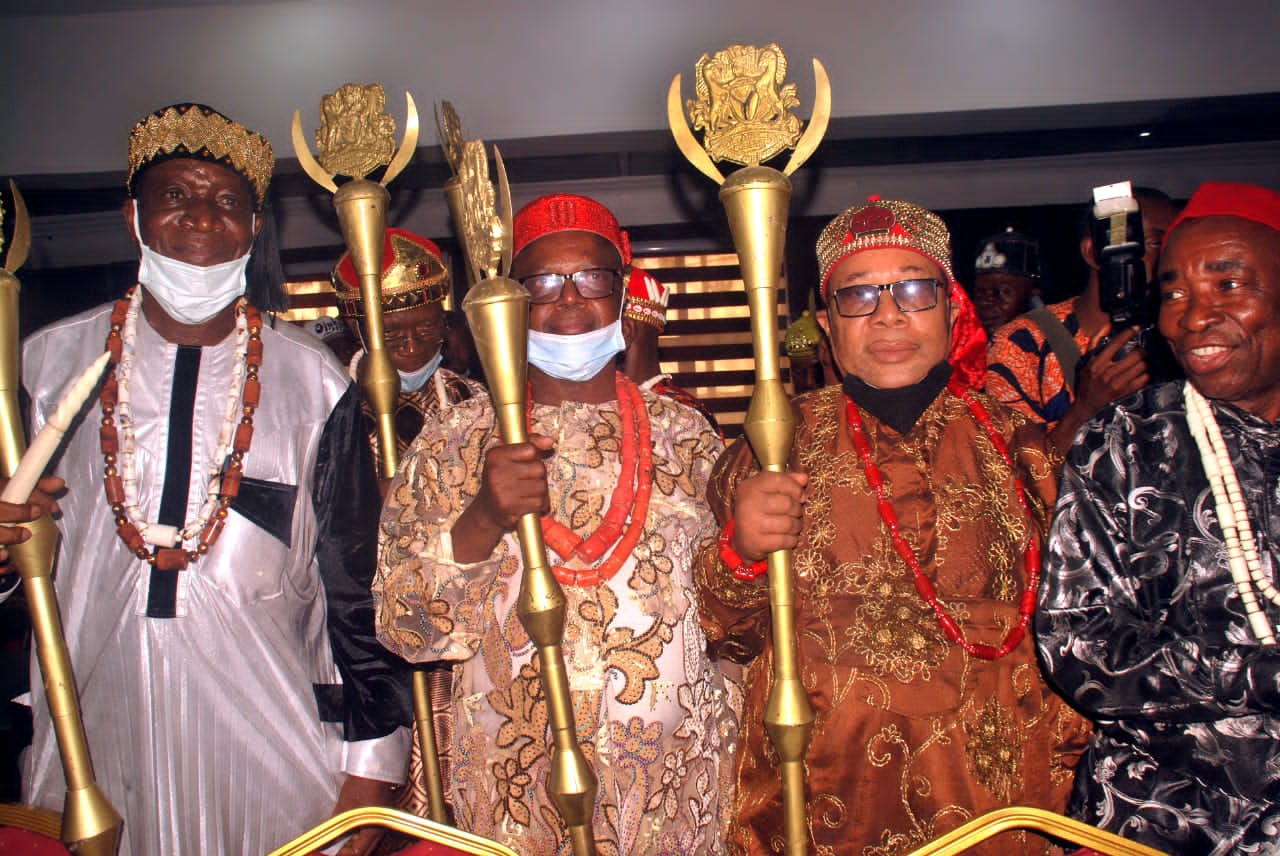
Traditional rulers award of staff of office in Igboland

Ofo is a staff also known as nkpara (stick) among the Igbo, It is a ceremonial insignia of status, authority and ritual office. They have traditionally been carried by titled men, elders and ritual officials, and form part of ceremonial dress. Staffs may be plain or carved with symbolic animal heads, while modern ceremonial examples are made of brass or copper. In Igbo religious tradition, the ofo is also regarded as a sacred staff of authority. Archaeological excavations at Igbo-Ukwu uncovered iron and bronze staffs, staff-heads and staff ornaments, including elaborate bronze castings made for both the heads and shafts of ceremonial staffs.

Thurstan Shaw reported that excavations at Igbo-Ukwu uncovered several iron and bronze staffs, staff-heads and staff ornaments dating to the ninth century AD. These were recovered from Igbo Isaiah, Igbo Jonah and Igbo Richard, together with objects found during the 1938 excavation. They include ceremonial staffs, bronze staff-heads, ornaments for staff shafts and copper snake ornaments fitted to wooden staffs.

One iron object was identified as the broken top of a staff. It is 5.1 cm high and has a short stem with a funnel-shaped top. An elaborate bronze staff-head was also found at Igbo Isaiah beside a bronze shell, with part of its iron shaft still attached. Shaw noted that the loops on the bronze staff-heads have the same decoration as the bronze belt plaques and the handle of a bronze bowl.

One bronze staff-head is a hollow cylinder with a round disc at the top covered with small raised dots. Three decorated rings rise from the centre above five spiral bosses. Around the middle is a raised band decorated with curved lines and small flies. The lower part has four snakes’ heads holding frogs in their mouths, alternating with okfour beetles. An iron tang projects from the base and is wrapped with four coils of copper wire. Shaw identified it as the head of a ceremonial staff.

Another bronze staff-head has a similar shape but different decoration. It has one ring at the top and four snakes’ heads without frogs. The surface is decorated with lozenges and small circles. Small loops were used to attach beads, and several beads were still in place when it was excavated.

At least five copper spiral snake ornaments were also found. They were probably fixed to the ends of wooden ceremonial staffs. Each ornament has a spike that fitted into the wood, leaving the coiled body projecting beyond the end of the staff while the snake's head rested on top.

Other bronze objects were made to decorate the shafts of ceremonial staffs. They are hollow cylinders about 16 cm high with a hole about 2.5 cm wide through the centre. One is formed by three coils ending in snake heads, each holding an egg in its mouth. Another is made from two intertwined snakes with heads at both ends and small balls between them. A third has the same form but replaces the snakes with birds, whose necks form the coils and whose bodies end in flat discs decorated with rows of raised dots and folded wings.

Decorated cylindrical staff ornaments were also recovered from Igbo Jonah. One has two birds facing in opposite directions beside the central opening. The ends are decorated with twisted string patterns, while the middle has alternating rows of fish and monkeys’ heads. Another has flat ends decorated with concentric semicircles and a middle section covered with rows of raised spheres and projecting straps. Shaw compared this decoration with that on bronze bowls from Igbo Isaiah and described both ornaments as finely made bronze castings.

Shaw also described the place of ceremonial staffs in Nri tradition. During a visit to Oreri, he met the son of the last Eze Nri, who was responsible for the royal regalia. The regalia included a ceremonial staff carried in the right hand, the ofo or praying staff placed between the ruler's feet, an elephant-tusk horn, a crown of fish-eagle feathers, a necklace made from leopard's teeth, bells, ivory wristlets and a Benin-type pectoral mask.

He explained that Eze Nri, meaning “King of Nri”, was both a spiritual and political ruler. Nri tradition held that the office did not pass immediately after the ruler's death. Instead, a successor was chosen only after signs showed that the sacred authority had passed to another person.

Shaw wrote that Nri ritual officials travelled between communities carrying staffs as signs of their ritual and political authority. They were identified by ichi facial marks and were regarded as sacred persons. Their work included settling disputes, making peace, enforcing ritual laws and taboos, explaining new religious and political rules, installing title holders and performing rites to remove ritual pollution.

He also referred to Michael Onwuejeogwu's view that Nri culture developed the idea of Chukwu and a form of sacred kingship expressed through the authority of a ceremonial staff. According to Shaw, Nri political and ritual influence declined between about AD 1400 and AD 1700 and came to an end under British colonial rule in 1911, although parts of its ritual tradition continued afterwards.

In discussing the Igbo-Ukwu bronzes, Shaw suggested that the repeated images of grasshoppers and beetles may have been connected with the office of the Eze Nri. He also noted that Nri ritual officials of different ranks possessed ceremonial staffs made of wood, iron, or both. These staffs served as badges of office and were carried during ceremonies and processions, with different types of staff linked to different titles.

- Features and symbolism

Ceremonial staffs vary in size, material and decoration. They may be made of wood, iron, bronze, brass or copper, and can be plain or richly ornamented. Some have plain shafts, while others are fitted with decorated staff-heads or bronze ornaments attached to the shaft or the end of the staff. Staff-heads may include rings, discs, loops, spiral coils and animal figures, while shaft ornaments are often cylindrical and decorated with snakes, birds, beetles, frogs, flies and raised dotted patterns.

The ofo is a sacred staff of authority in Igbo religion. Traditionally, it is made from a branch of the ofo tree that has fallen naturally rather than one that has been cut. It is regarded as the principal symbol of Igbo spirituality. Among the Igbo, ceremonial staffs are carried by titled men, elders and ritual officials as signs of office and status. They form part of ceremonial dress and are carried or raised during public ceremonies. Elephant-headed staffs symbolize strength, while lion-headed staffs symbolize leadership and tiger-headed staffs symbolize agility and quickness. Modern ceremonial staffs are commonly made of brass or copper.

== Odu ==
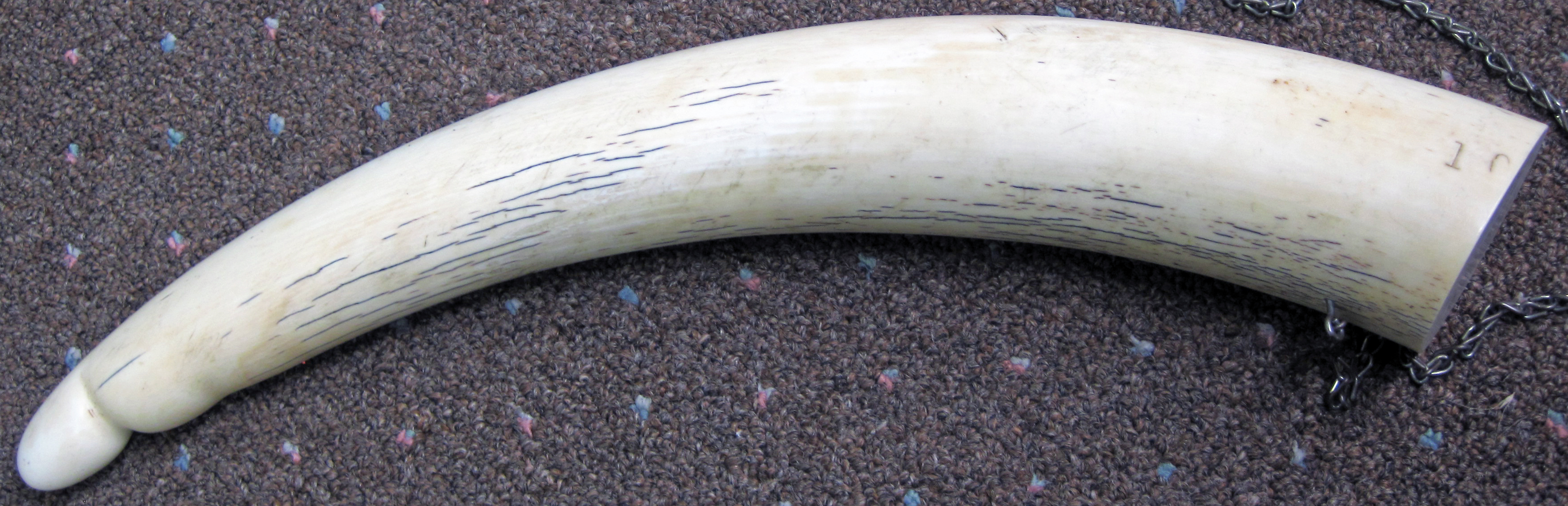
Elephant Ivory tusk

Odu refers to ivory in Igbo language. It is also known as odu enyi literally elephant tusks. Ivory tusks are an important part of Igbo ceremonial regalia and are associated with authority, prestige and ritual status. They are used by titled individuals, particularly holders of the Ozo title, who may have a tusk fashioned into a ceremonial horn. Ownership of an elephant tusk is regarded as a mark of social standing, while tusks are also described as symbols of creation. In some parts of Igboland, particularly the Aleanyi area, elephants once roamed in large numbers, and elephant hunting and the ivory trade formed important sectors of the local economy. The cultural importance of ivory is also reflected in Igbo personal names referring to elephants, tusks and ivory.

Shaw recorded that the regalia of the Eze Nri included an ivory elephant-tusk horn, together with a staff, an ofo, a crown of fish-eagle feathers, a necklace of leopard's teeth, bells, ivory wristlets and a pectoral mask.

All ivory objects recovered at Igbo-Ukwu came from the royal burial chamber at Igbo Richard dated ninth century. Three elephant tusks formed part of the principal burial assemblage and marked the northern, central and southern parts of the grave

The northern tusk lay beside the crown, decorated copper roundels, a bronze leopard's skull and a pectoral plate. The central tusk lay beneath a circle of spiral copper bosses and copper anklets. The southern tusk was found near a copper fan-holder, a bronze horseman hilt, copper anklets and beads.

Members of the Otu Odu Society were traditionally identified by ivory ornaments known as odu, worn on the wrists and ankles. These ornaments symbolised honour, nobility, and social distinction.

Ivory is a prominent regalia insignia of the members of otu odu; an ivory association of Igbo women. They often wear white pair of wrappers called Akwaocha and white headties known as Ichafu in Igbo usage. The ivory ornaments consist of elephant tusks known as odu enyi. This is usually held at the hand with horsetail whisks (Nza), ivory anklets and wristlets (odu úkwù and odu aka). These items serve as visible symbols of membership in the society and the status associated with it.

== Úgbá ==
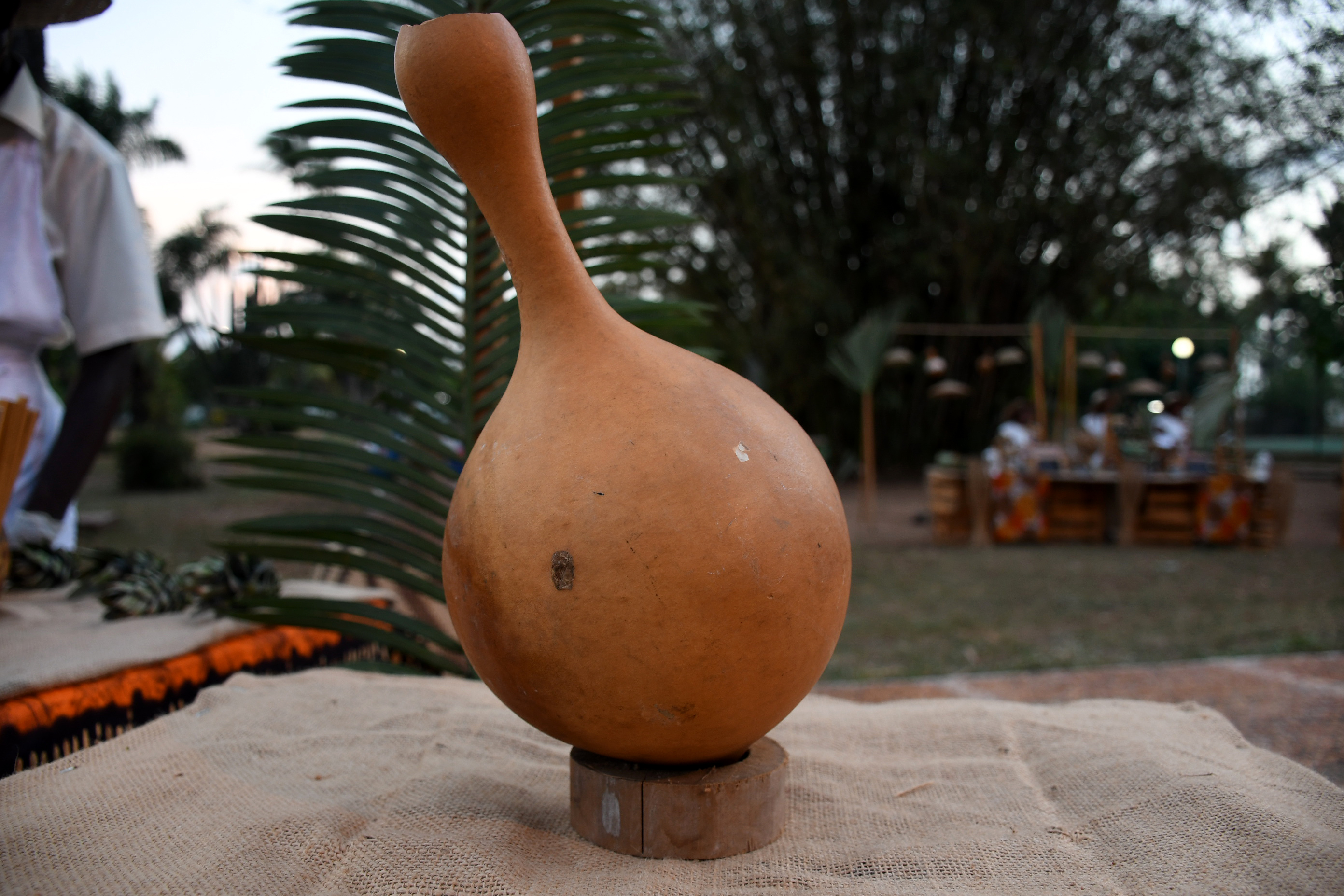
Úgbá (Calabash)

Úgbá refers to calabash in Igbo language. Calabashes are used in Igbo ceremonies and traditional practices, where they serve as containers for food, drink and ritual items. Archaeological evidence shows that they were also part of ceremonial objects in the ninth century.

Fragments of decorated calabashes were recovered from the Igbo-Ukwu ninth century dated archaeological sites. At Igbo Isaiah, about forty pieces were found in the deposit between the bronze shell and the broken scabbard. Fourteen smaller fragments were decorated with straight or curved incised lines, as well as patterns of concentric circles, parallel lines and hatched triangles. Other pieces were found attached to copper bosses, and one large decorated fragment remained fixed to a copper handle. The handle was secured to the calabash with copper strips passed through the vessel.

== Igbo traditional dress ==
=== Men ===
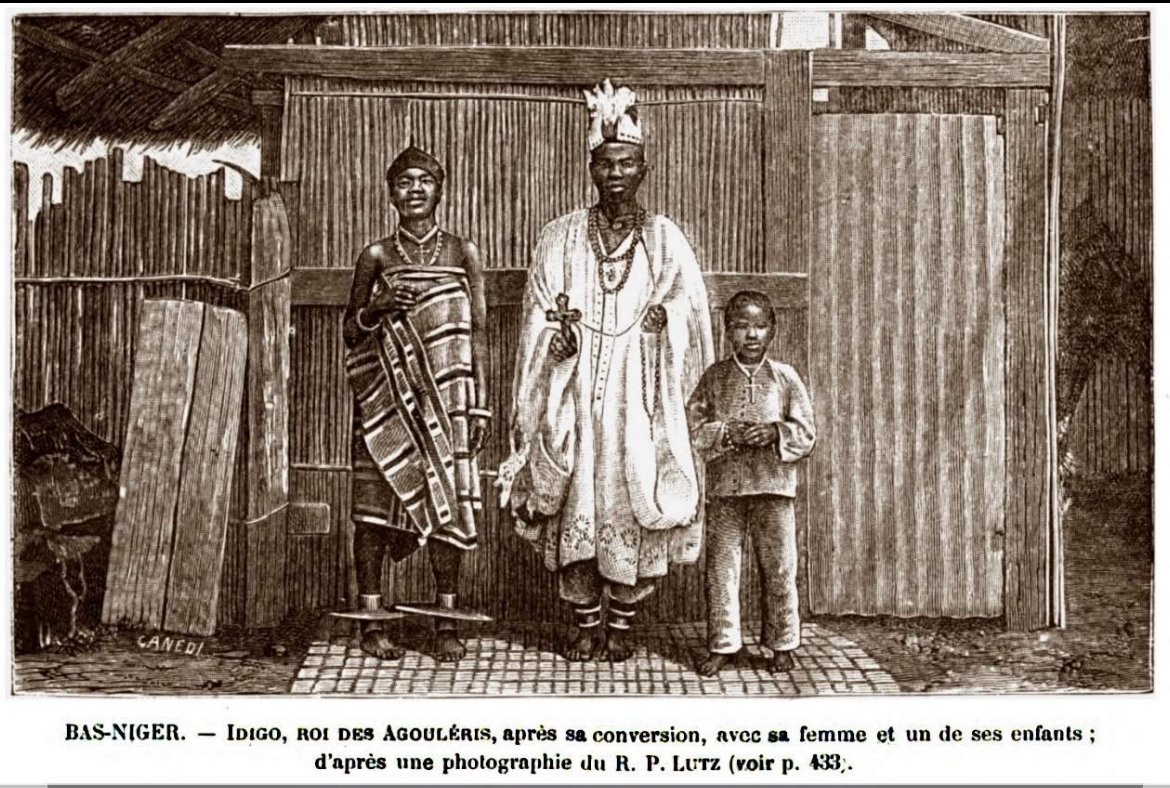
An Igbo King in royal ceremonial dress and okpu-eze (crown) and an Igbo woman wearing wrappers and anklets ( odu úkwù) 1890.

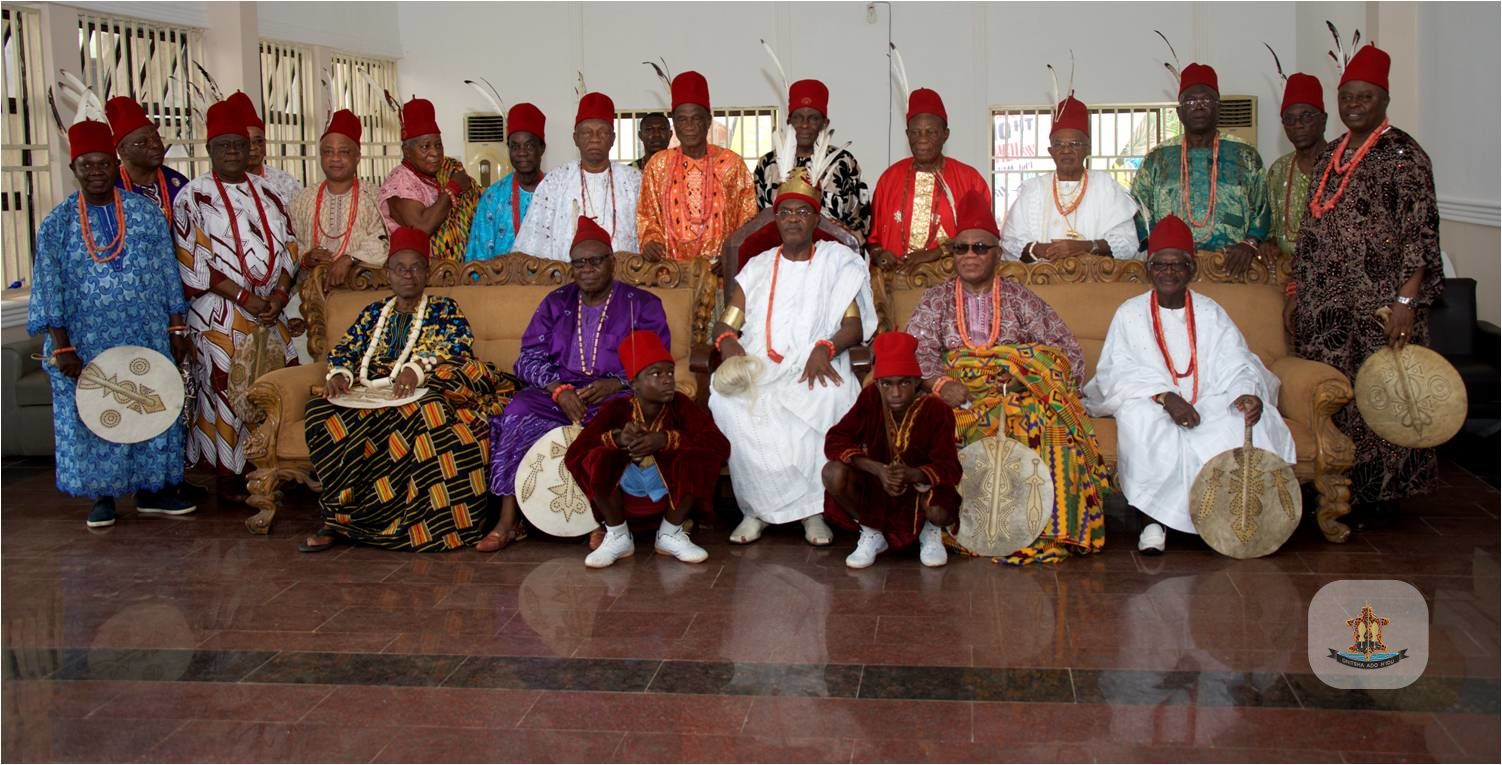
Igbo titled men in traditionalceremonial attire

Igbo traditional dress for men typically comprise of loose cotton shirt or robe over an ankle-length wrapper, or loin cloths, or a two-panel cloth worn around the waist together with a three panel cloth draped over one shoulder in the style of a toga. The cloths are fashioned from various local Igbo fabrics like the Isiagu, Akwete or Akwaocha complemented with okpu, akupe, odu enyi, mkpara, ofo and adornments with aka (coral beads) worn around the neck and wrists. These regalia items proclaim status within the society. Royal robes, royal headdresses, silver sword were used to describe the attire of Igbo royalty like the Obi of Onitsha by Nzimiro and Henderson while the red cap chiefs dressed in their own special attire. The robe is part of the ceremonial regalia of the Eze Nri. A large robe covers the body from the neck to the feet and is described as old, gold in colour and having a velvet-like texture. It is worn with a felt hat and striped puggaree of European manufacture, decorated with eight fish-eagle feathers. The full ceremonial attire also includes a cowhide crown with fish-eagle feathers, copper anklets worn on the bare feet, a sacred ofo staff bound with copper, an iron spear wrapped with copper bands, a necklace of old brass bells worn over the left shoulder, a black goatskin hanging from the left elbow, an omu or protective medicine worn on the left wrist, an iron spear carried in the right hand, and a brass human-face mask worn around the neck during public audiences.

=== Women ===
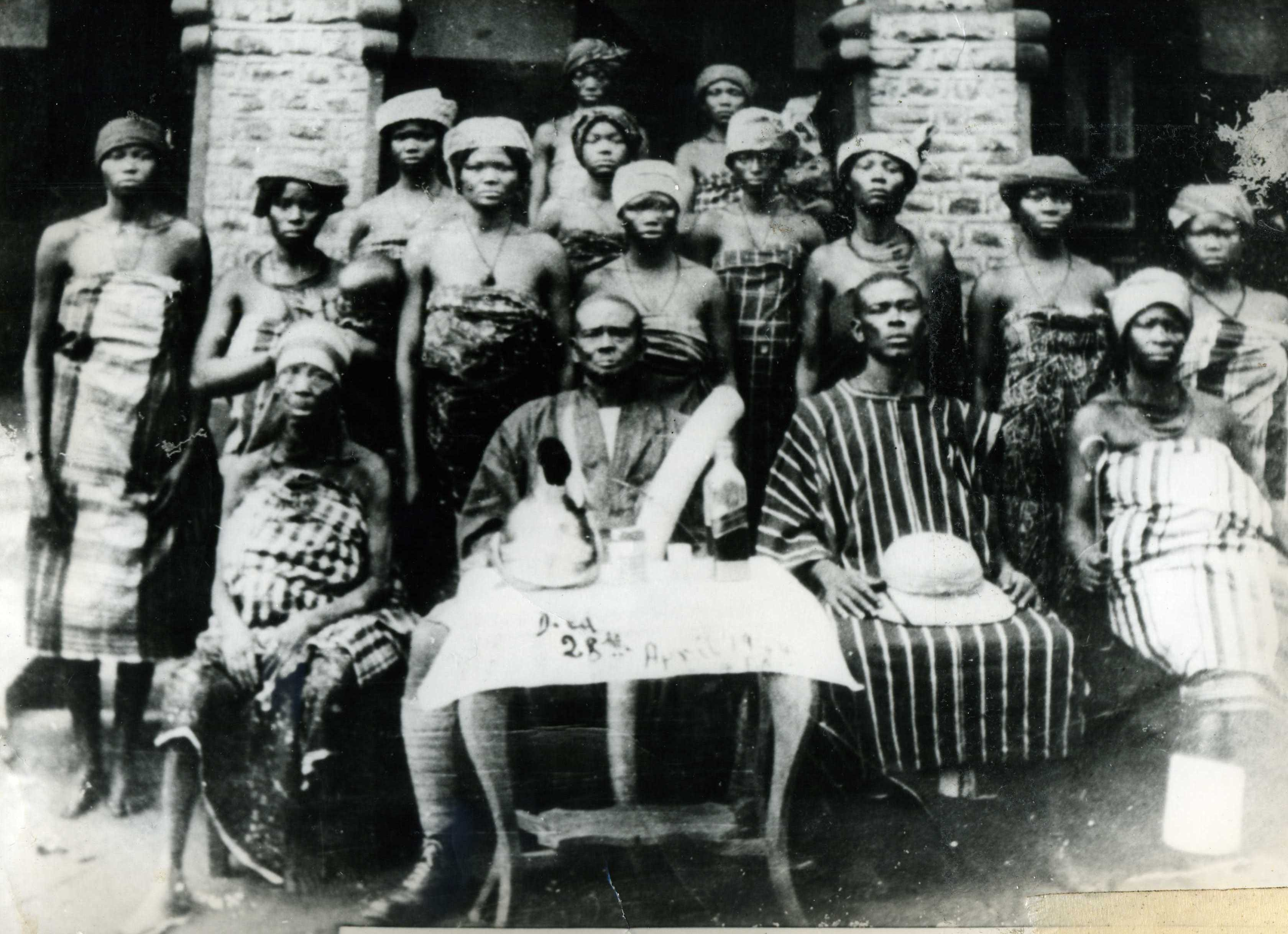
1913 archival photograph of Igbo women standing behind their husband, Ojiako Ezenne and his brother by the right and mother by the right. Their appearance depict the women wearing wrappers fastened beneath the arms and headwraps

Among the women, the typical tradition of dress consist of a pair of matching wrappers or double wrappers known as eregbor na ntukwasi, a blouse called efe obi made of Akwete or George fabrics and Ichafu. In ordinary circumstances according to M.M Green in 1947, the women wore short wrappers folded around the hips and reaching the knee with a headcloth while for ceremonial functions a blouse or tunic was worn together with the waist wrappers and festive headcloth

Igbo women complement their dressing with aka (beads) and Jewellries especially for festivities or ceremonial occasions like traditional marriage known as Igba nkwu.The beadded accessories include aka or nkalari (coral beads) worn around the neck and wrists and used as earrings, mgbaji (flat circular waist beads) worn around the waist, and ola (iron bangles) around the ankles.

- Layered Identical Double Wrappers (Eregbor na Ntukwasi), Blouse (Efe obi) and Ichafu

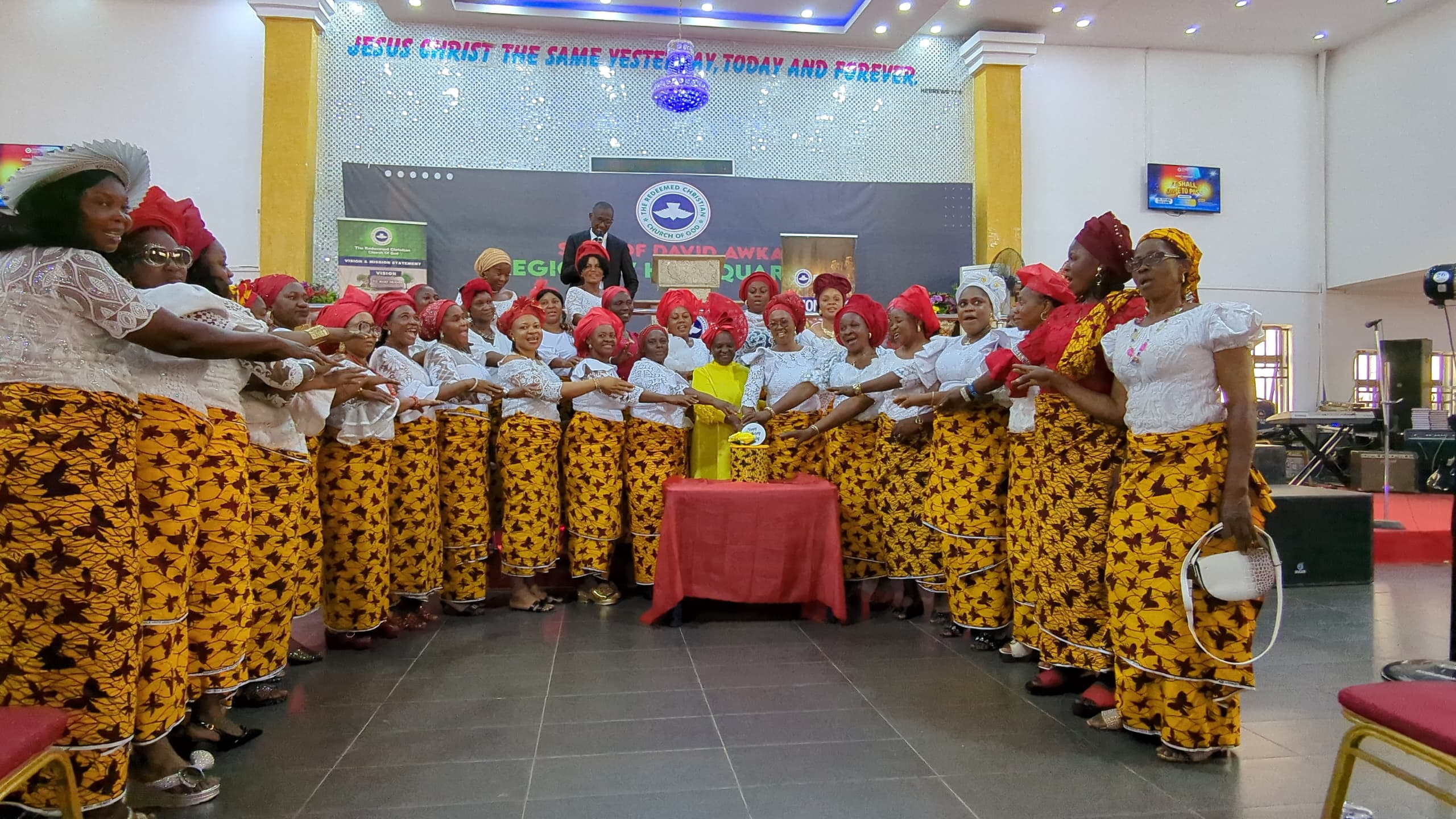
Igbo women in traditional ceremonial attire. The appearance depicts them wearing double layered wrappers of unequal length and headwraps

Traditionally, Igbo women's textiles like Akwete of all category are woven in pairs of identical design as well as sold in pairs. These pairs are not sewn together but worn together. The two pairs of wrappers are known as eregbor na ntukwasi, made of multicolored geometric or floral design. The first wrapper is wrapped around the waist and extends down to the ankle. The second wrapper overlaps the first from the waist to the knees, giving the wrappers a layered look. The wrappers are paired with a blouse known as efe obi which s tucked inside. This combination of wrappers and blouse are paired with head ties described by Chimamanda Adichie as Ichafu. The textiles used are usually Akwete and George. In recounting her past, Chimamanda Ngozi Adichie describes how she had seen her mother dress up in her double wrappers, blouse and Ichafu.

She folded and twisted and pinned her Ichafu until it sat on her head like a large flower. She wrapped her George - heavy beaded cloth, alive with embroidery, always in bright shades of red or purple pink - around her waist in two layers, The first, the longer piece, hit her ankles, and the second formed an elegant tier just below her knees. Her sequinned blouse caught the light and glittered. Her shoes and handbag always matched

— Chimamanda Ngozi Adichie, Style and Substance: Why What We Wear Matters

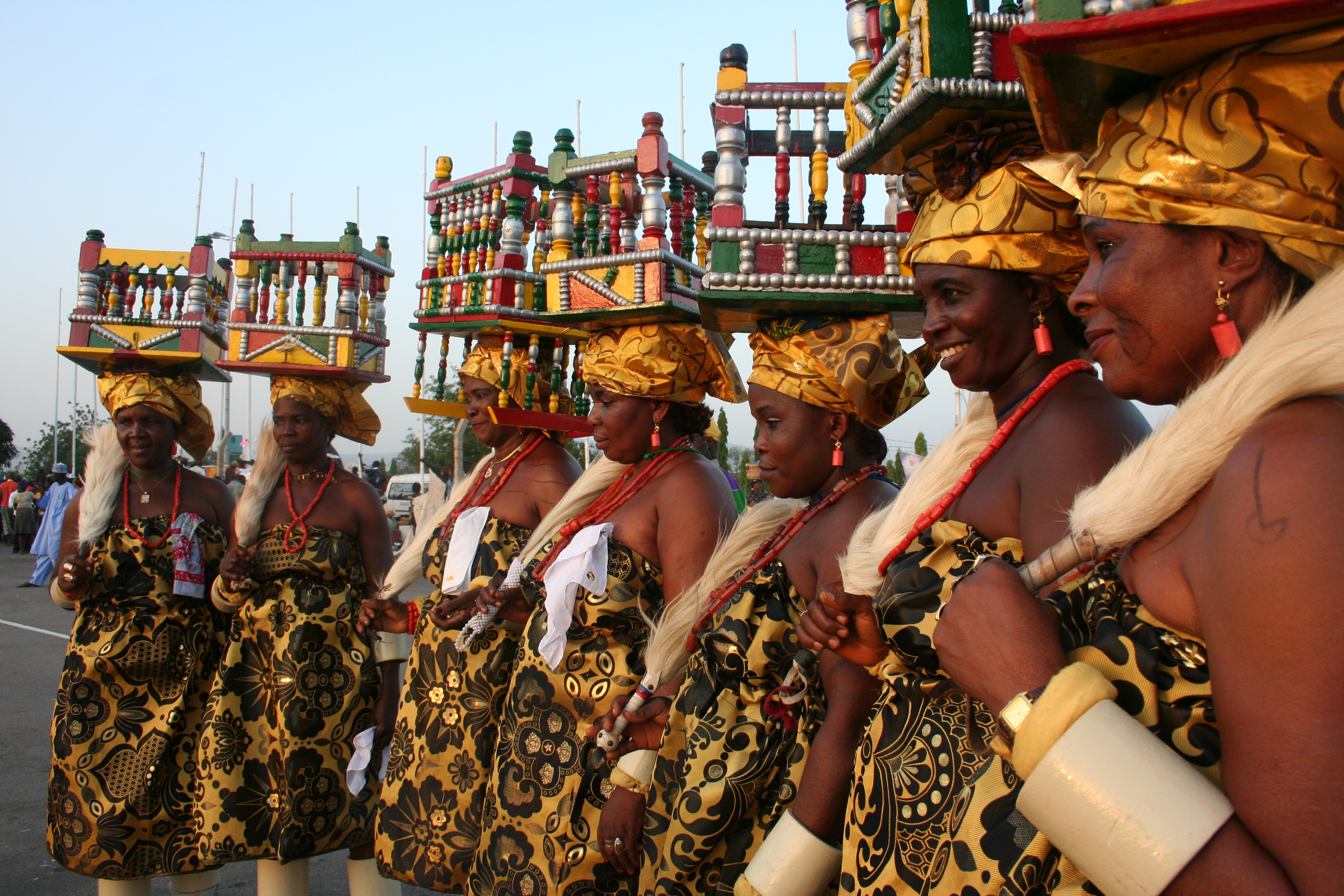
Otu odu women (Ivory association of Igbo women) in traditional attire. Their appearance depicts them wearing wrappers fastened underneath the arms and waist, headwraps, hand-held fly-whisk ivory wristlets and an insignia object on the head with Uli body art decoration.

Another double wrapper styling is described in Akwa ocha weaving tradition where the first wrapper is folded around the waist and extends to the ankle while the second is fastened beneath the arms and the third worn as a head-tie. This style of wrapper is seen among the otu odu women; an ivory association of Igbo women.

This attire ensemble of layered double wrappers called eregbor na ntukwasi paired with a blouse and Ichafu (Ichafo) head tie is also complemented with jewelleries as described by Chimamanda and Uzo Aduba who had witnessed their mother and aunt dress up.

- Short wrappers and Tunics

Traditionally, Igbo women also wore short wrappers and tunics or blouses. The wrappers are folded around the waist reaching the knee and combined with Tunics or blouses and headcloths or beaded head crowns and complemented with other beaded accessories for festivities.

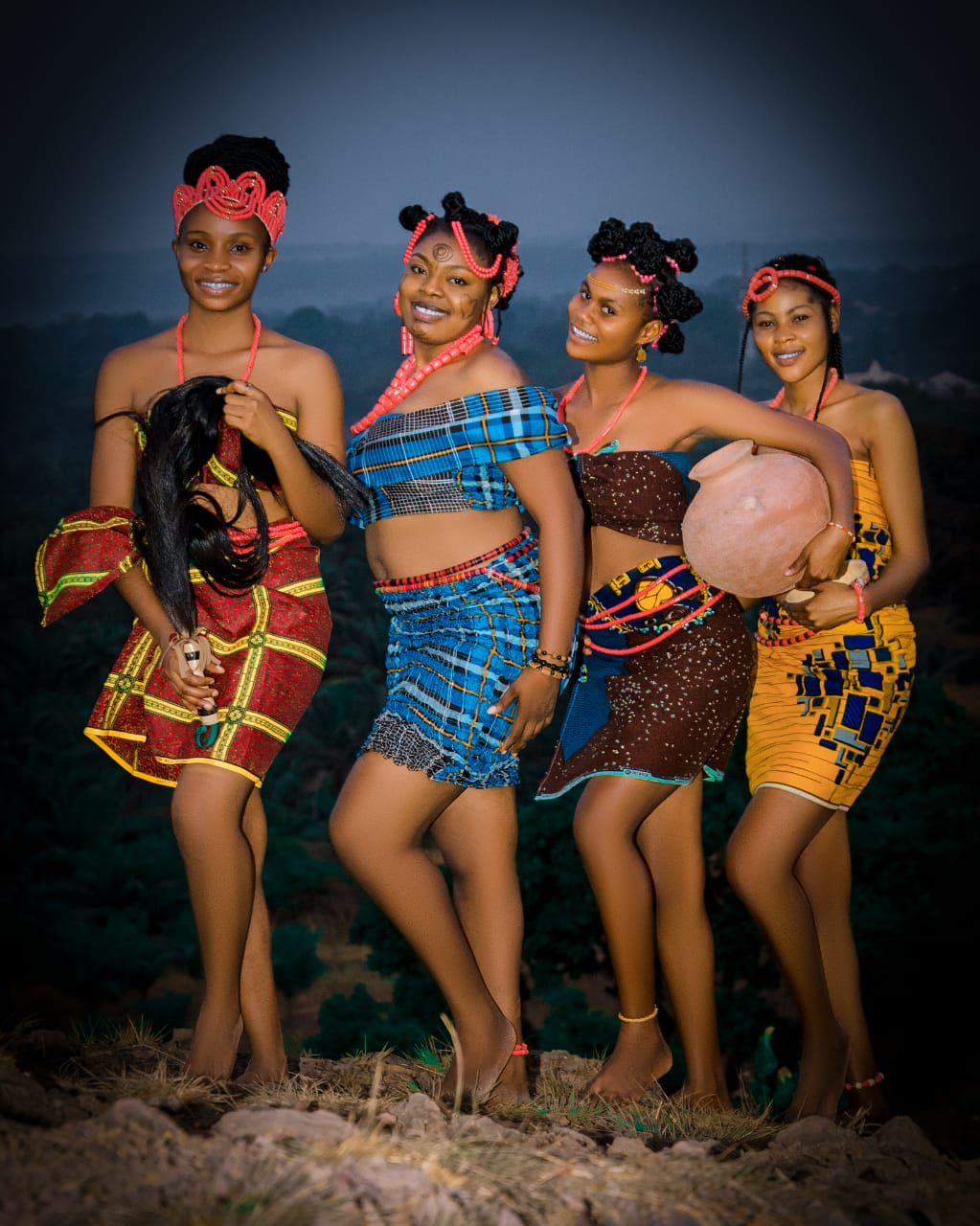
Igbo maidens wearing a traditional ceremonial clothing of short wrappers and tunics, beaded accessories, a hand-held fly-whisk and a calabash

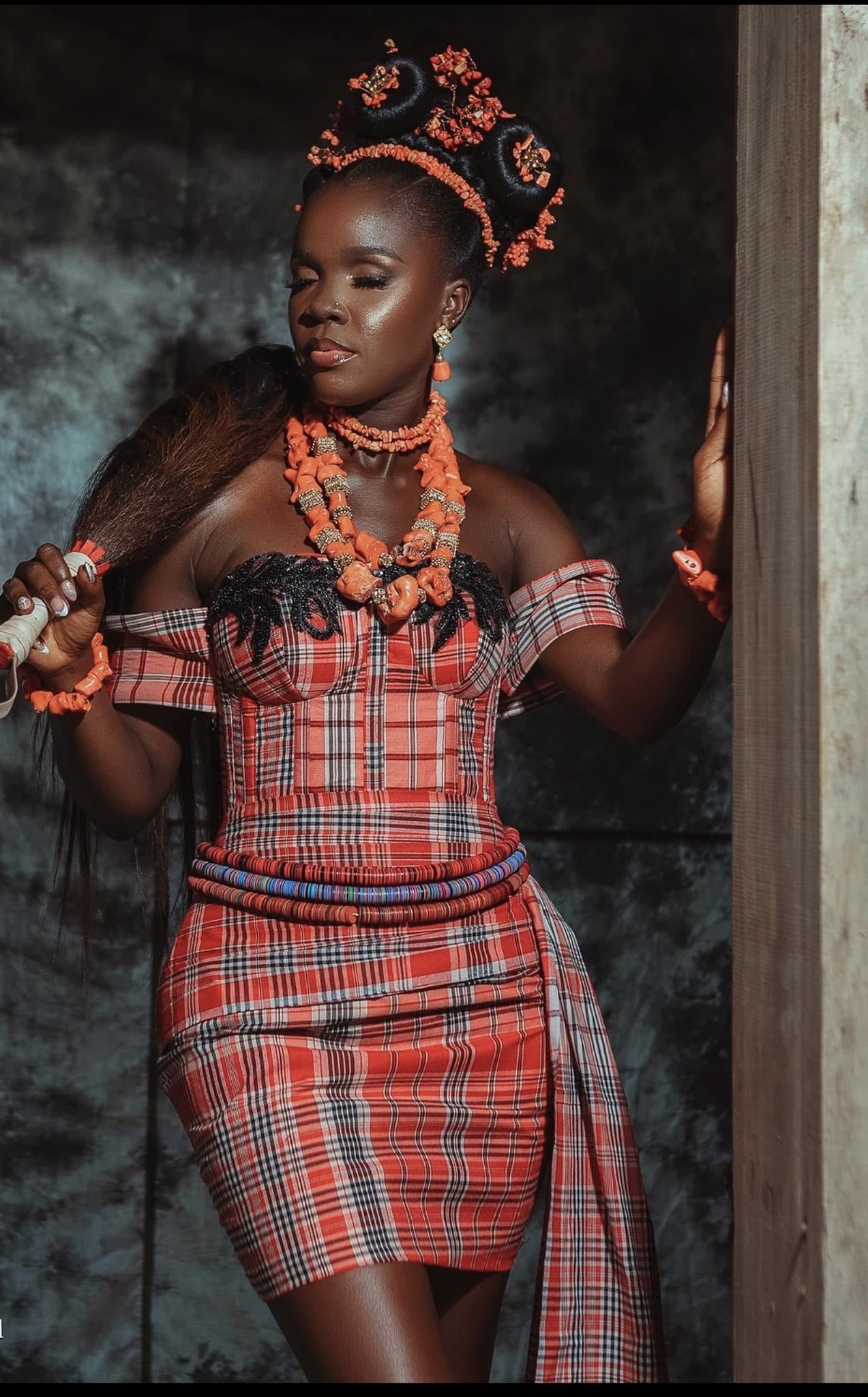
Igbo traditional clothing of knee-length Jioji wrappers and tunic.

== Traditional textiles and symbolism in Igbo culture ==
Textile manufacture and use in Igboland dates back to archaeological excavations at Igbo-Ukwu where large fragments of physical textiles were unearthed from three sites known as Igbo Isaiah, Igbo Richard and Igbo Jonah carbon-dated 9th century by Thurstan Shaw.

The excavated textiles were examined by the Shirley Institute in Manchester, which identified numerous examples of plain-weave fabrics. Microscopic analysis showed that many of the yarns consisted of bundles of bast fibres, while others were made from flat ribbon-like fibres. Several fragments retained woven edges (selvedges), seams and folded yarns, demonstrating that they were carefully constructed textiles rather than loose vegetable fibres. The report identified a variety of woven structures among the recovered specimens. Some fabrics were coarse and tightly woven, while others had a finer and more open weave. Microscopic examination revealed that both single and folded yarns had been twisted in the “S” and “Z” directions. The Shirley Institute regarded this as evidence that the craftspeople possessed a high degree of textile-making skill. The report concluded that the quality of the spun yarns reflected the quality of the woven material.

The textile assemblage also revealed diversity in weaving practices. While most specimens followed recognised plain-weave structures, one fragment from Igbo Isaiah displayed an unusual woven pattern that did not conform to any commonly known weave. The Shirley Institute suggested that, if the reconstruction was correct, the textile represented a distinctive structure combining characteristics of woven cloth and bark-cloth construction, illustrating experimentation and technical variation in fibre-working.

A 2022 AMS study on two textiles from Igbo-Isaiah produced a result for one of the textile calibrated 1027–1180 AD.

Textile production and use in Igboland are also recorded in early historical accounts of the eighteenth and nineteenth centuries. Olaudah's 18th century account describes garment manufacture by process of cotton spinning, weaving and dying.

Likewise, early nineteenth-century European travellers and missionaries recorded that cotton cultivation, spinning, weaving and dyeing were already established in many parts of Igboland. Their accounts describe locally produced cotton cloth, the use of indigo as a dye, and the manufacture of textiles for clothing and trade with great solidity and durability.

Adolphe Burdo described textile production at Onitsha, noting that cotton was cultivated, spun and woven into cloth on simple looms. He wrote that the cloths were durable and that the thread was dyed with indigo before spinning. He recorded as follows:

They clean their cotton, spin it, and weave it on primitive and very simple looms… Before spinning the thread they dye it with indigo, which grows wild among them.

— Adolphe Burdo, The Niger and the Benue

Only the heart of the indigo plant was used in preparing the dye and the resulting blue compared favourably with European dyes. While visiting Nsụbé, the explorers recorded that the local king wore a cotton jacket and trousers together with a red cap, coral beads and ornaments made from wild animal teeth during a formal reception.

Captain Hugh Crow's 1830 account of the “Eboe” country also referred to textile production. He recorded that grass and cotton cloth was manufactured locally and described the use of blue dye, and the abundance of blue colouring indigo dye in the region and spontaneous growth of cotton. He recorded as follows:

The clothing is made from a kind of thread manufactured from grass…A superior kind of cloth is also made from cotton where there grows abundantly .Their dyes are pretty good, particularly the blue…indigo must be abundant in the country

— Captain Crow, Memoirs of Captain Crow

In his 1854 publication, Baikie recorded the manufacture of country cloth with ornamented perforations by Enugu people and sold at market towns near the confluence.

Taken together, these historical accounts document the cultivation of cotton, the spinning and weaving of thread, the use of indigo dye, the production of locally woven cloth, and the wearing of cotton garments, raffia and bark cloths in different parts of Igboland since 9th century and 18th century onwards. They also show that locally made textiles were present in regional markets and formed part of everyday life as well as formal and ceremonial dress.

The most significant Igbo textiles include the Akwete, Akwa ocha, Isiagu, ukara cloth, Jioji cloth among others.

=== Akwete cloth ===
Akwete cloth is the best-known product of the Igbo women's vertical loom tradition and has been woven for generations by women of Akwete. Formerly known as Akwa Miri, it developed from a simple utilitarian cloth into one of the most valued ceremonial textiles in Igboland. The cloth is woven on the vertical loom as broad single panels and is usually produced in matching pairs of identical design. Holmes records several varieties of Akwete, including Real Akwete, Jioji (George), Ikaki, Popo, and other named types distinguished by their weave, pattern and intended use. The decorative repertoire is equally varied and includes traditional motifs such as Ikaki (tortoise), Nnadede, Ebe (hand), birds, the Nigerian Coat of Arms, as well as later designs known as Oil Boom and Air Conditioner, showing how Akwete weavers incorporated both older cultural symbols and contemporary themes into their work. These motifs are arranged in geometric bands and supplementary-weft patterns that emphasize the technical skill of the weaver rather than fixed symbolic meanings for every design. Traditionally, Akwete cloth was worn at marriages, title-taking ceremonies, festivals and church celebrations. Women wore two matching wrappers with a blouse, while men wore a single wrapper around the waist with a shirt. The cloth was also tailored into European-style dresses, skirts and other garments, demonstrating its adaptability while retaining its status as a prestigious woven textile. Fine Akwete wrappers formed part of a bride's marriage gifts and were widely regarded as symbols of wealth, honour, skilled craftsmanship and Igbo cultural identity.

=== Isiagu ===
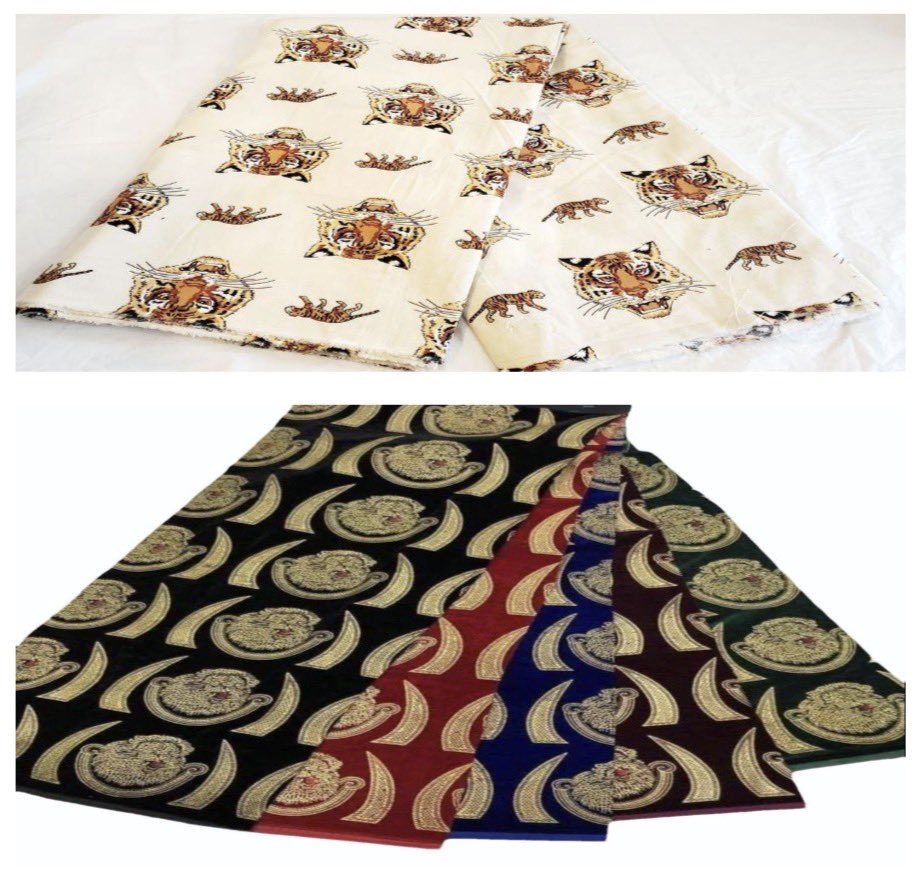
Isiagu fabrics

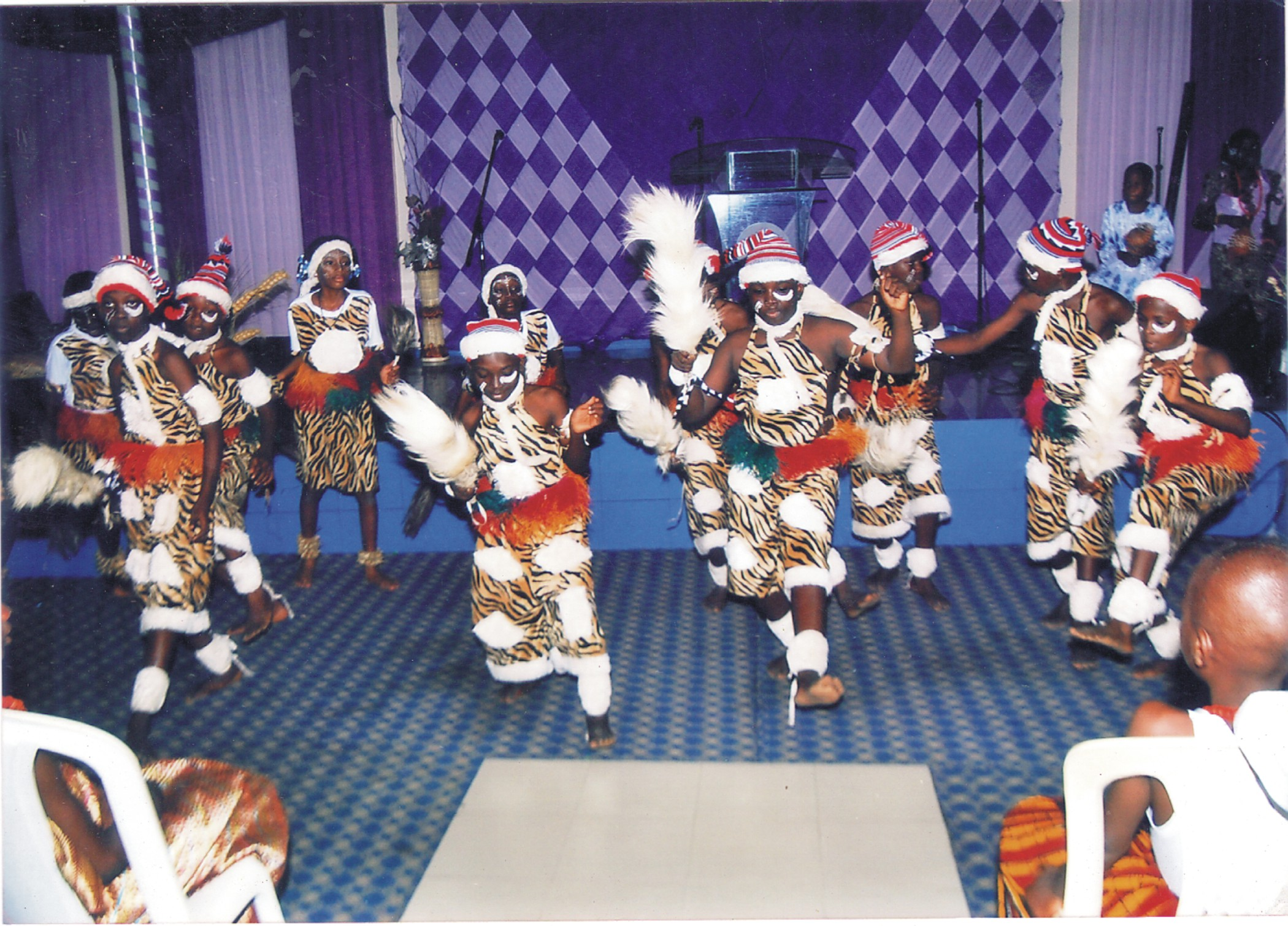
Igbo cultural group children. Their appearance depicts them we aring okpu agụ, Leopard-pawed dresses and a hand-held fly-whisk

Isiagu (literally “leopard head”) is both a traditional Igbo textile design and a ceremonial style of dress. The name originally refers to the repeating leopard-head motif woven or printed on the fabric, but today it also refers to the complete attire made from that cloth. English-language publications have described the design as a leopard, lion, or tiger motif, re myflecting different translations of the same symbolic pattern rather than different garments.

The origins of the leopard motif in Igbo culture are ancient. Archaeological discoveries at Igbo-Ukwu, dating to about the ninth century CE, include bronze vessels and other objects decorated with leopard figures. One well-known bronze vessel from Igbo Isaiah is surmounted by a leopard standing on a circular pedestal and decorated with concentric circles, diamond shapes and herringbone patterns. These objects show that leopard imagery formed part of early Igbo artistic and ritual traditions, where the animal symbolised power, leadership and authority.

Later studies show that the leopard continued to be one of the most important symbols in Igbo society. Leopard imagery appears in sculpture, masks, pottery, ritual objects and decorative arts. The repeated triangular pattern known as agu (“leopard's paw”) became an important design in Ekpe art and also appears in uli decoration and other traditional artistic forms. The leopard also became a common symbol in masking traditions and was associated with authority, social control and community leadership.

Studies of Igbo symbolism further show that the leopard represented strength, courage, honour and high social status. Leopard hunters were respected, while high-ranking titled men wore leopard-tooth necklaces and other regalia as signs of office. Leopard imagery also appeared on masquerades, ceremonial objects and other symbols of authority, and praise names such as Agu Ike (“Strong Leopard”) reflected ideals of strength and leadership. These traditions explain why the leopard became closely associated with chiefs, titled men and community leaders.

As a textile, Isi agu is recognised by its repeating animal-head pattern arranged across brightly coloured cloth, usually in black, gold, red and other contrasting colours. The fabric is tailored into shirts, tunics, robes and flowing gowns and is worn with wrappers, trousers or other traditional accessories depending on the region and occasion.

Isi agu is especially worn during title-taking ceremonies, traditional weddings, festivals, chieftaincy events, royal ceremonies and other important cultural occasions. It is closely associated with titled men, chiefs and community leaders, although it is now widely worn by other men during important celebrations. Modern studies continue to describe Isi Agu as one of the best-known symbols of Igbo identity and ceremonial dress, often worn with a red cap, coral beads, walking staff and, in some communities, an eagle feather. The continued use of Isi agu demonstrates the long history of leopard symbolism in Igbo culture. From the leopard figures of ninth-century Igbo-Ukwu to the ceremonial dress worn today, the figure and motif has remained a long-standing symbol of leadership, prestige and Igbo cultural identity.

=== Akwa ocha ===
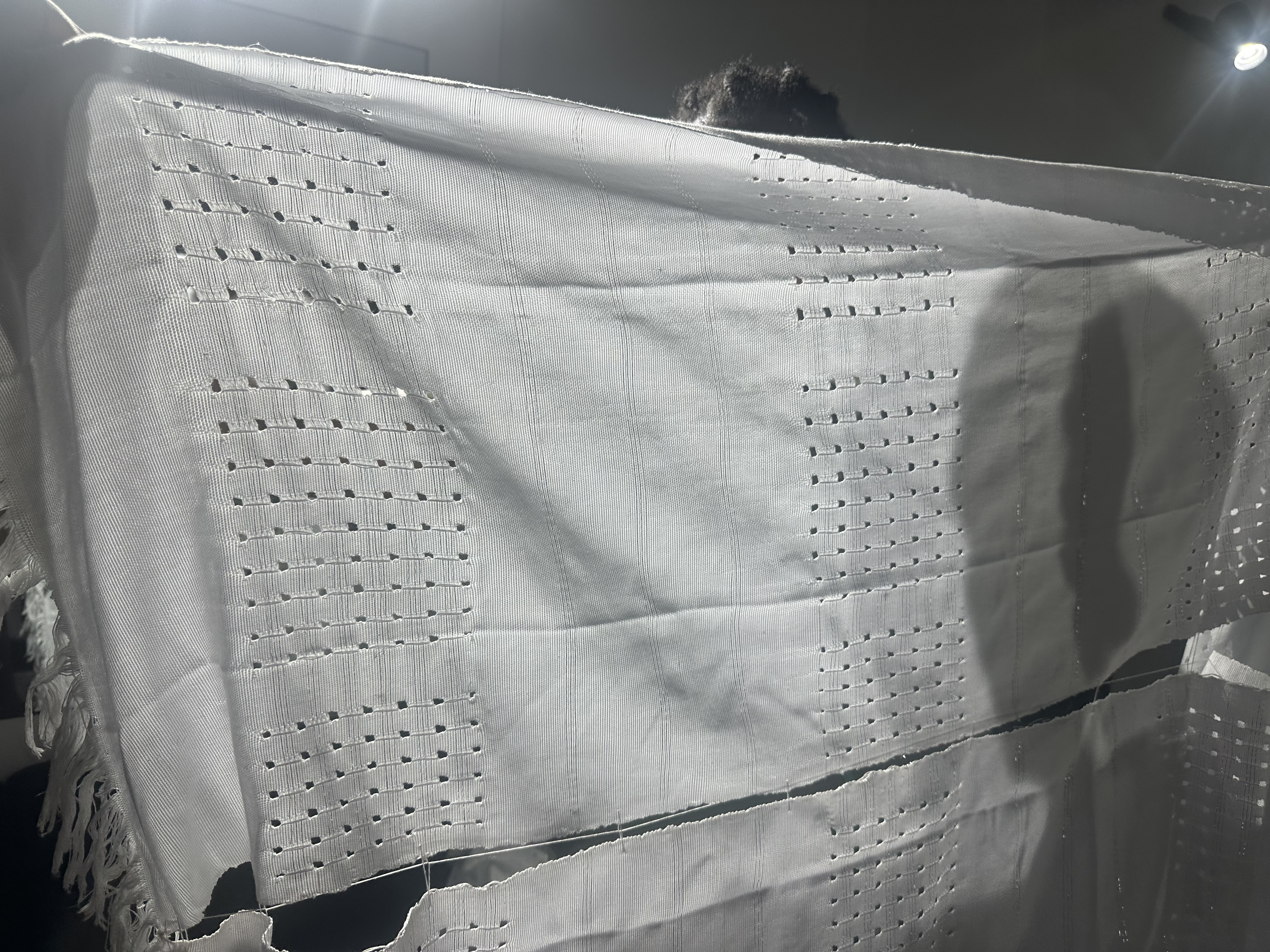
Akwa ocha hand woven cloth

Akwa Ọcha is a traditional handwoven white textile of the Igbo people worn for ceremonial occasions. Woven from locally grown or hand-spun cotton, it is distinguished by its white background, often decorated with woven inlay, narrow bands, geometric designs and stylized motifs such as the tortoise.

One of the earliest descriptions of white cloth manufacture, use and sales among the Igbo people is recorded in Crowther's 1854 publication where he stated as follows:

I took a short walk in the extensive corn and yam plantations… The people of Onitsha… manufactured their own clothes, generally plain or fanciful white. European manufactured goods are not so commonly used here as in the lower parts of the river… On holidays the people appear in their best, in cloths of their own manufacture, from cotton grown on their own farms. Their cloths are nearly all white…

— Taylor and Crowther, Gospel on the banks of the Niger

Likewise, Holmes and Lamb in their fieldwork of 1979 noted concentration of white cloth in Asaba and nearby Ubulu-Uku community known as aguba ocha.

The cloth is traditionally worn during title-taking ceremonies, initiations, festivals, funerals, masquerade performances and other important communal events. Among the Onitsha Otu Odu women's title society, the official ceremonial attire consists of a white Akwa ocha wrapper, white head-tie (Ichafu), white shoes or slippers, a white handbag, and coral or aka beads, reflecting the dignity and honour attached to the title. The white colour of Akwa Ọcha symbolizes purity, peace, dignity, honour, spiritual cleanliness and authority, and for this reason it has long been associated with titled men and women, ritual specialists and other respected members of society. Among the Enuani people, Akwa Ọcha also serves as a cultural emblem and is worn during shrine festivals and traditional ceremonies, while certain religious and traditional office holders wear white Akwa Ọcha garments as a sign of ritual responsibility and leadership. Today, Akwa Ọcha remains one of the best-known traditional Igbo textiles and continues to represent Anioma identity, cultural heritage and ceremonial prestige.

=== Ukara ===
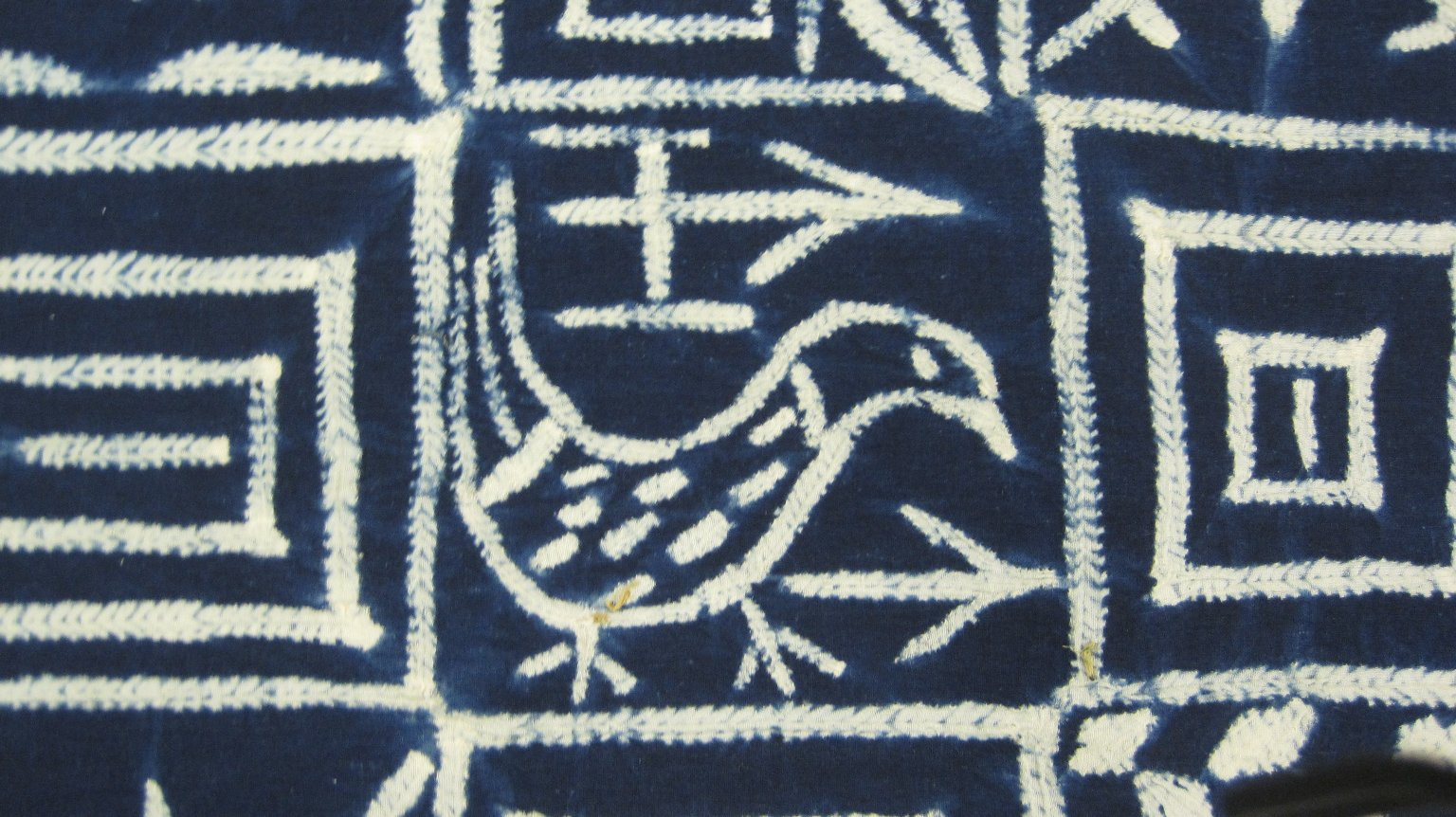
Ukara cloth

Ukara cloth, also called Ukara-Igbo, is a traditional indigo-dyed cloth made by the Igbo of southeastern Nigeria. It has a deep blue background decorated with white Nsibidi symbols, geometric designs, and images of animals and plants. The cloth is closely linked to the Ekpe society, where it is worn by initiated members as ceremonial dress and represents rank, authority and identity. It is also used by the Efik, Ejagham (Ekoi), Ibibio, Oron and other Cross River communities, as well as in parts of western Cameroon where the Ekpe institution exists.

Ukara is usually worn as a wrapper by senior Ekpe members and is also displayed in the throne rooms of chiefs and kings. Its Nsibidi motifs serve as a coded means of communication among Ekpe members.

Traditionally, Ukara was made by weaving, stitching and indigo dyeing. Abakaliki was one of its main production centres. Men wove the cloth, while craftsmen from Ohafia, Abiriba and Arochukwu stitched the decorative patterns. Titled and postmenopausal women then dyed it with indigo according to customary regulations because of its sacred connection with the Ekpe society.

Besides being worn, Ukara is used in many Ekpe ceremonies. It is used masquerade costumes, such as those of the Nkanda society. During the burial of an Ekpe member, it may be used to form a tent-like structure, while the walls of the deceased's house are decorated with the cloth. In Ekpe lodges, it marks areas reserved for initiated members and represents the presence and authority of the society.

Ukara remained in use during the colonial period and after the spread of Christianity. The Igbo, Efik, the Obong continued to wear Ukara together with ceremonial items such as crowns, staffs, sceptres and robes during important ceremonies, including coronations.

=== Motifs and designs ===
Ukara is decorated with animal, plant and symbolic motifs that have specific meanings within the Ekpe society.

- Tortoise (mbe): A common figure in Igbo folktales, proverbs and riddles, associated with wisdom, resilience and determination. On Ukara, it represents resilience and determination.
- Hand: Represents work, skill, strength, productivity and the ability to accomplish tasks. It symbolizes power, capability and the value of hard work.
- Python: A sacred animal in many Igbo communities, linked with traditional religion, deities and ancestors. On Ukara, it represents sacredness, spiritual power and protection.
- Crocodile: Represents strength, dominance, adaptability and authority.
- Leopard (Agu): Represents courage, strength, authority, leadership and high status.
- Sunflower: Represents hope, positivity, vitality, resilience and perseverance.

=== Jioji cloth ===
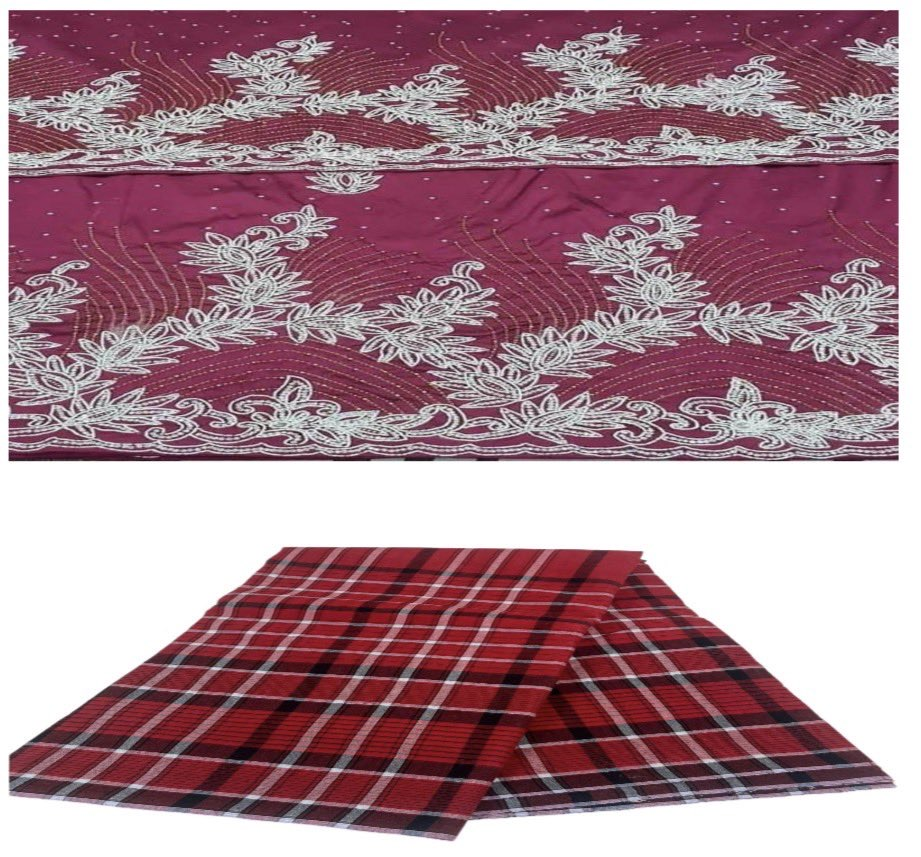
Jioji (George) clothes

Jioji cloth, also known as George cloth, is a striped ceremonial textile widely worn by the Igbo people, especially in Akwete and neighbouring communities. Although it was inspired by imported striped fabrics from Madras and Pulicat in India, Igbo weavers adapted the design and developed it into a distinctive locally woven cloth.

According to Judy Holmes Lamb, the name George is linked to the renowned Akwete weaver Madam Jorji Nmereji Nbokwo, whose family name later changed from Jorji to George. Over time, the name came to refer not only to the original cloth woven at Akwete but also to a broader range of locally woven and imported striped textiles worn as part of Igbo dress.

Traditionally woven on vertical looms, Jioji cloth is characterized by striped and checked patterns, colorful plaid designs with embroidered motifs. Red, blue, black, green, yellow and white are among the most common colours, although combinations vary according to the weaver and intended use. The cloth is woven in long narrow strips which are sewn together to produce larger wrappers and garments.

Historically, Jioji cloth became one of the principal prestige textiles worn by Igbo women who commonly wear them as wrappers and as an ensemble that consist of wrappers, blouse made of Austrian lace fabric and two yards of richly embroidered Hays taffeta headtie. It is also commonly worn by Igbo men as wrappers It was especially associated with marriage ceremonies, title-taking, funerals, festivals and other important social occasions, where expensive wrappers signified wealth, social standing and family prestige. In many communities, women acquired several George wrappers during marriage, and they became treasured heirlooms passed from one generation to another.

During the twentieth century, imported George materials from India, Europe and later Asia increasingly supplemented locally woven cloth. Despite this, Akwete weavers continued producing locally woven Jioji cloth, preserving traditional weaving techniques while adapting to changing fashions and consumer demand.

Today, jioji cloth remains one of the most recognizable ceremonial textiles among the Igbo. It is widely worn during traditional weddings, chieftaincy ceremonies, cultural festivals, funerals and other formal occasions throughout southeastern Nigeria and among the Igbo diaspora. Modern versions include both imported fabrics and locally woven Akwete variants.

== Gallery ==

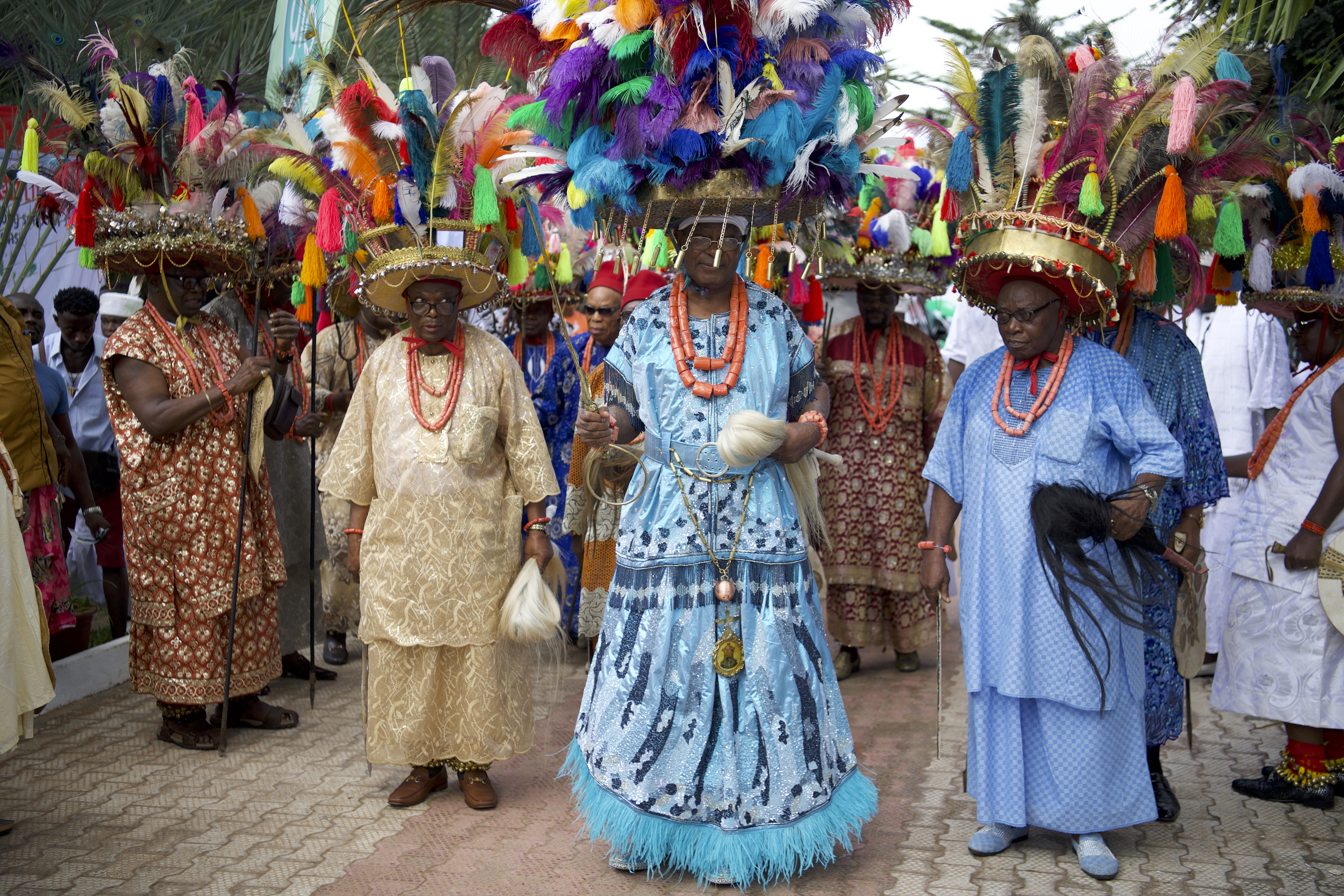

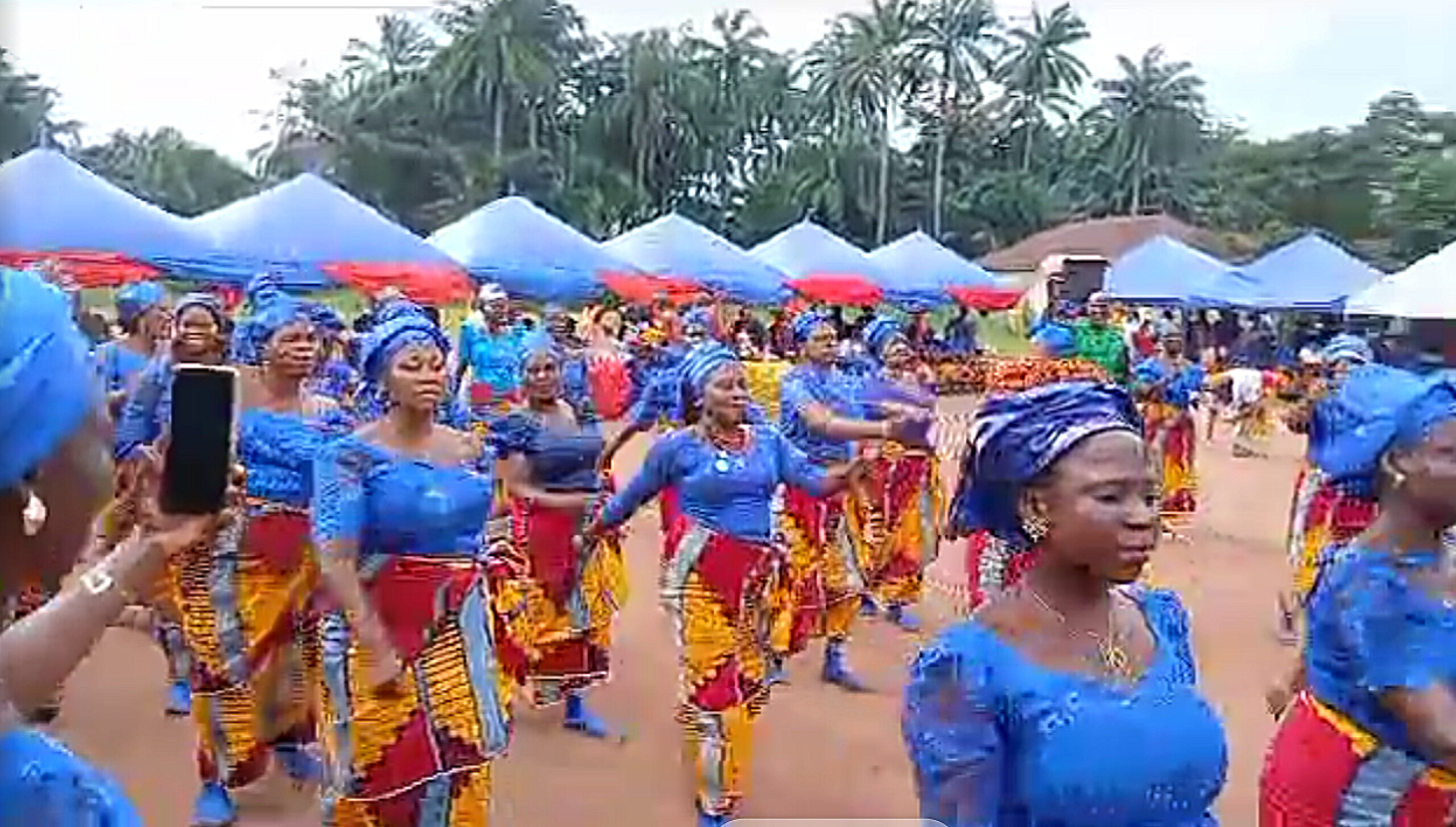

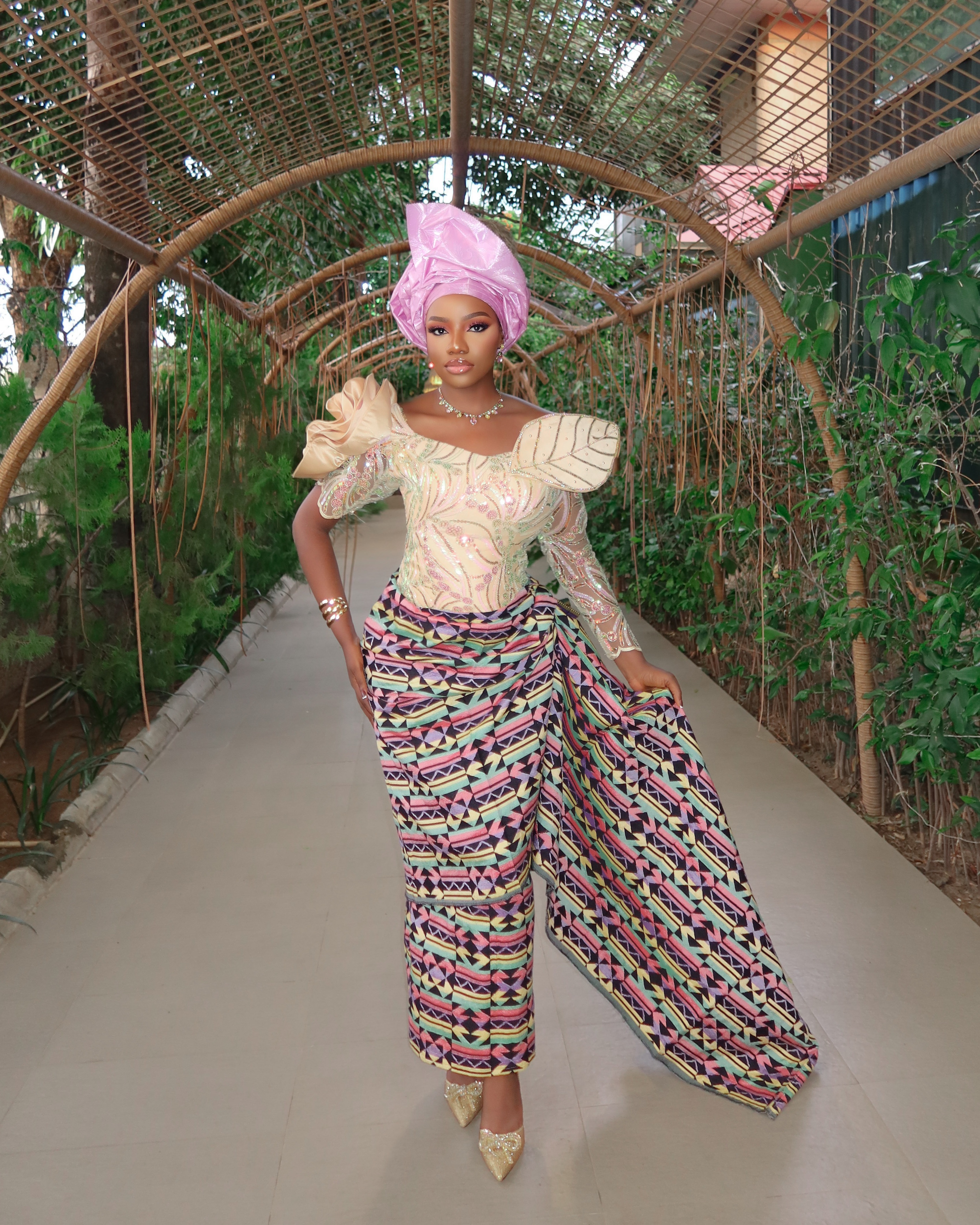

== See also ==
- Akwete cloth
- Ukara cloth
- Isiagu
- Akwa ocha
- Jioji cloth
- Uli design
- Igbo people
- Igbo culture
- Beadwork
- Akupe (hand fan)
- Okpu Ozo
