= Jesus de Greatest =

Statue of Jesus Christ in Imo state, Nigeria

- Interactive map of Jesus de Greatest
- Location: Abajah, Imo, Nigeria
- Coordinates: 5.6769°N 7.1394°E
- Type: Statue
- Material: Marble
- Height: 8.53 metres (28.0 ft)
- Beginning date: 2013
- Completion date: 2015
- Opening date: January 1, 2016
- Dedicated to: Jesus Christ

Jesus de Greatest is a statue of Jesus Christ in Abajah village in Imo State, Nigeria. It is the fifth tallest statue in Africa, and the largest of Jesus.

Jesus de Greatest is 8.53 metres (28.0 ft) tall and weighs 40 tons. It stands barefoot with both arms outstretched, and was carved out of white marble. It was unveiled on January 1, 2016. Mass was held at St. Aloysius Catholic Church, Abajah with the presiding of the bishop of Orlu Catholic Diocese, Ret. Rev. Augustine Ukwuoma with hundreds of Roman Catholic priests and worshippers, and the unveiling of the statue was held on New Year's Day.

Obinna Onuoha, a 43-year-old businessman, commissioned the building of the statue in 2013. He said that he had a dream in 1997 to build a giant statue of Jesus.

== See also ==
- List of statues of Jesus
- List of statues by height
