= Abajah =

Village in Imo state

Coordinates: 5°40′54″N 7°07′04″E

Abajah is a village in Imo State, Nigeria. It is in the Nwangele Local Government Area.

The village is the location of a nine-meter-high statue, Jesus de Greatest.
