= Ndoki tribe =

Ethnic group in southeastern Nigeria

Ndoki
Ali Ndoki

Languages
- Igbo

Religion
- Christianity; Omenala

Related ethnic groups
- Ngwa; Bonny and Opobo; Ikwerre; Andoni; Etche

Ndoki also known as Ọkwa are a tribe of Igbo people located in the hinterland of Igboland and in the coastal region of Bonny and Opobo in Nigeria.

Pre-colonial Ndoki covers 450 square kilometres (170 mi^{2}) with rich farmland which borders Imo River on the East and Aba River in the South bounded by Ika and Obong villages. It's subgroup include Akwete, Azumini and Ohambele. Today, Ndoki people exist in Abia State, Akwa Ibom and Rivers State.

== History ==
The Ndoki people are said to have migrated from the Imo River. Some Ndoki people migrated South to Rivers State and East to Akwa Ibom state.With their engagements with other Igbo speaking people, they developed a strong Igbo culture and formed their own dialect of Igbo language. During the Scramble for Africa, Ndoki became a British protectorate on 5 June 1887. A garrison and a district headquarter was established in 1896 but was moved to Aba in 1902 and 1903 respectively. Ndokiland was formally annexed as a part of Aba in 1946. This halted the urbanisation that was slowly settling in. During the creation of states in Nigeria, Ndoki was balkanised with parts of it residing in Abia State (Ukwa East), Akwa Ibom and Rivers State (Obigbo).

== Culture ==
Masquerading and folklore is a part of the culture of the Ndoki people. One of the masquerades include Oku-kpum or Eru-Onwa masquerades of the Azumini areas, which exhibits jumps and summersaults and the Ari-ada which expands and contracts in size as it performs. The people of Ndoki and Ngwa were said reputed cannibals, that is to say, after war they eat the flesh of their enemies, but generally in secret.

Like the cultures in some parts of Igbo land, dead bodies are generally interred. During burials for a chief, slaves were killed, bullocks were killed and eaten, guns were fired, dancing and other amusements took place. In Ndokiland, slaves that were bought had privileges of cultivating their farmland and marriage. However, this was only with the guarantee of a freeborn.

== Demographics ==
Pre-colonial Ndoki covers 450 square kilometres (170 mi^{2}) with rich farmland which borders Imo River on the East and Aba River in the South bounded by Ika and Obong villages. It's subgroup include Akwete, Azumini and Ohambele.

The population of the Ndoki people were reduced by raids conducted by the Bonny and Opobo during the end of the slave trade. From the 1953 consensus, Ndoki had a population of 35,000, and rose to 41,037 in 1963. There are Ndoki villages in Etim Ekpo local government area of Akwa Ibom State, they include Mkpukpuaja, Ogbuagu and Ohaobu. In Rivers State, there are fourteen villages in Oyibo local government area of predominantly Ndoki people. These include Umuagbai, Mgboji, Ayama, Obunku, Umosi, Obeakpu, Azuogu, Egberu, Afamnta, Afamukwu, Okoloma, Obete, Okpontu, and Marihu. In Abia State, they include Akwete, Ohanso, Ohambele, Ohanku, Obohia, Ohuru, Akirika, Akirikaobu, Abaki, Mkpukpuowha, Obozu, Umuogo, Azumini, Eti, Mkpuajakere, Ubaku, Ohandu, and Umuibe.

== Economy ==
During the Scramble for Africa, most of Ndoki clans were major routes for slave trade and later palm oil and rubber. In the mid-1800s, Bonny Kingdom controlled the markets in Ndokiland, particularly, Akwete and Ohambele. Following the Bonny Civil War in 1869 and founding of Opobo, King Jaja controlled the markets exclusively and shared the markets with Bonny Kingdom only after the Peace Treaty in 1873. The economy of Ndoki particularly in Ohambele was solely based on slave trade and agricultural produce particularly palm oil after slave trading was abolished. Trade between the Bonny, Nembe and Kalabari—were transacted through the Imo-Bonny River. Ndoki people traded agricultural produce with Ijo people and slaves with the Aro people. Following a struggle for the control of Ndoki markets, King Jaja was extradited on 16 September 1887 by Harry Johnston. The extradition of King Jaja created a direct trade between Ndoki people and the British and also a halt of Ngwa migration into Ndoki. However, slave trading with the Aro ended after the Anglo-Aro War in 1901. Following the abolition of the trans-Atlantic slave trade by the British, Ndoki served primary as a palm oil depot. This brought metropolitan investments into Ndoki land and the establishment of palm oil mills particularly at Obohia-Ndoki and Azumini. With the trading activities in Ndoki, the Akwete cloth rose to prominence and with its Rivers neighbours patronising them in huge quantities. Jelly gas and hydrocarbon are naturally resources in Ndoki which is said to contribute more than ₦86 million to the Nigerian economy.
