= Wrapper (clothing) =

West African dress

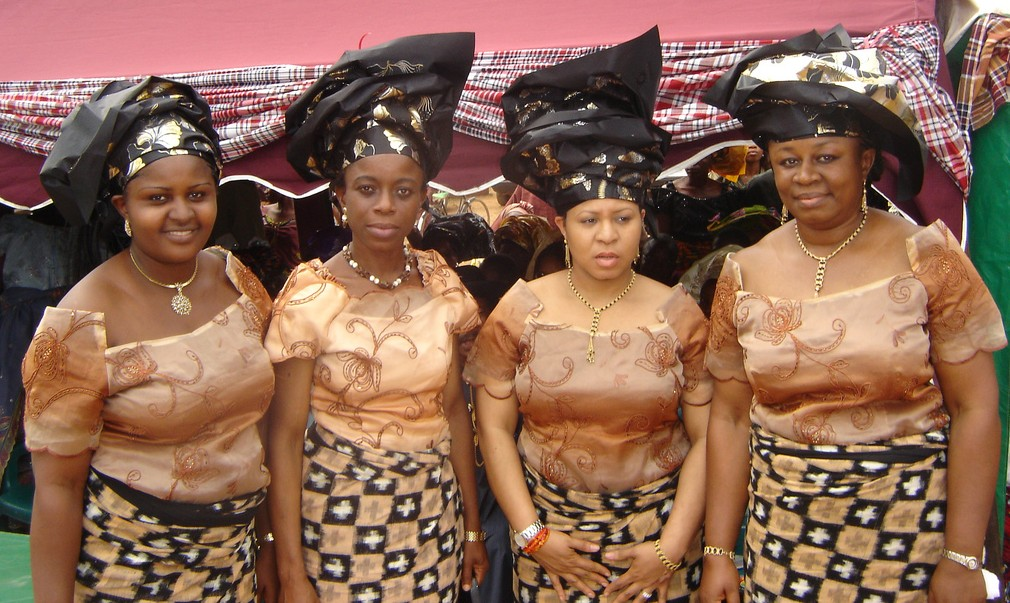
A group of Nigerian women wearing blouse and wrapper sets.

The wrapper, lappa, or pagne is a colorful garment widely worn in West Africa by both men and women. It has formal and informal versions and varies from simple draped clothing to fully tailored ensembles. The formality of the wrapper depends on the fabric used to create or design it.

== West African kaftan/boubou ==
In West Africa, a kaftan or caftan is a pull-over woman's robe. In French, this robe is called a boubou, pronounced boo-boo. The boubou is the traditional attire in many West African countries including Senegal and Mali. The boubou can be formal or informal attire. The formality of the kaftan depends upon the fabric used to create or design it.

== Wrappers ==
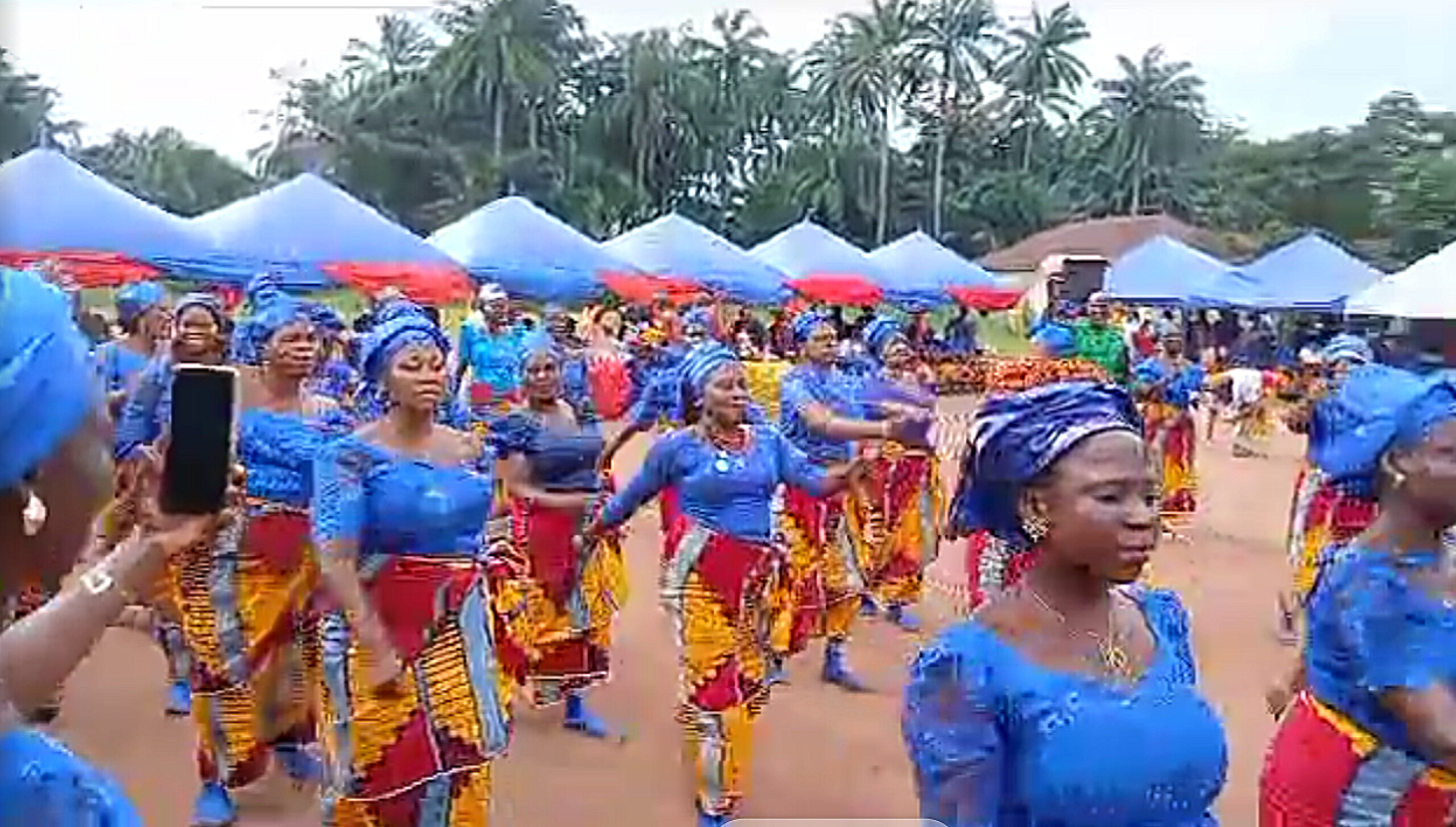
Igbo women dressed in their wrappers, performing inter-communal parade competition

In the Nigerian context, the Igbos call it akwa or ogodo and are mostly worn in double set by married women with their ịchafụ (and with various names such as Igbo hollandaise, African wax, depending on the product) during eventful occasions and for different purposes such as age grade and association uniforms, wedding ceremonies, chieftaincy title taking, women monthly meetings, burial ceremonies, church activities, August meeting , etc.

In Yorubaland, the wrapper is commonly called an iro in Yoruba, pronounced ee-roe. The literal translation is "the act of wrapping." The wrapper is usually worn with a matching headscarf or head tie that is called a gele in Yoruba, pronounced geh-leh. A full wrapper ensemble consists of three garments, a blouse, called a buba, pronounced boo-bah, the iro and a headscarf called a head tie called gele in Yoruba. Traditional male attire is called a agbada.

== Pagne ==
Pagne (French: [paɲ]) designates a certain cut (two by six yards) and type (single-sided "fancy" or double-sided "wax" prints) of untailored cotton textile, especially in Francophone West and Central Africa. Enormously popular in much of tropical Africa, the pagne cloth's usage and patterns may be used to convey by the wearer a number of social, economic—and sometimes even political—messages. It is similar—though distinct in size, expected pattern, and usage—to the Khanga, Kikoy or Chitenge of East and Southern Africa. From the pagne any number of garments may be created (the boubou, dresses, or western style suits) or it can be used untailored as a wrap, headtie, skirt, or tied as a sling for children or goods. The word pagne, likely derived from the Latin pannum, was a term introduced by merchants from the 16th Century and adopted by several African societies to identify often pre-existing textiles or garments distinct from a simple cloth. The Portuguese pano for cloth has become the French pagne , Dutch paan, and others. It appears to have originally referred to East Asian textiles traded in East and West Africa, before becoming a term for a certain length (a yard, later two by six yards) of commercial printed cloth sold in coastal West Africa.

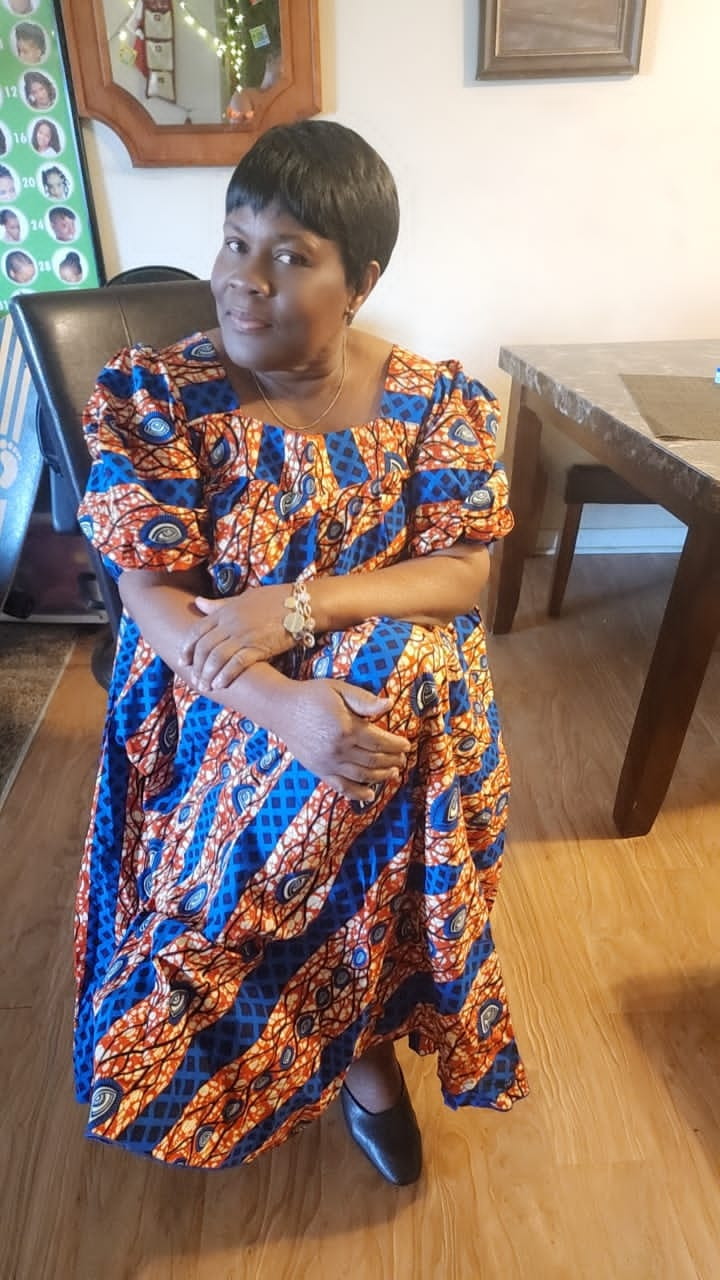
Ewe woman wearing African pagne

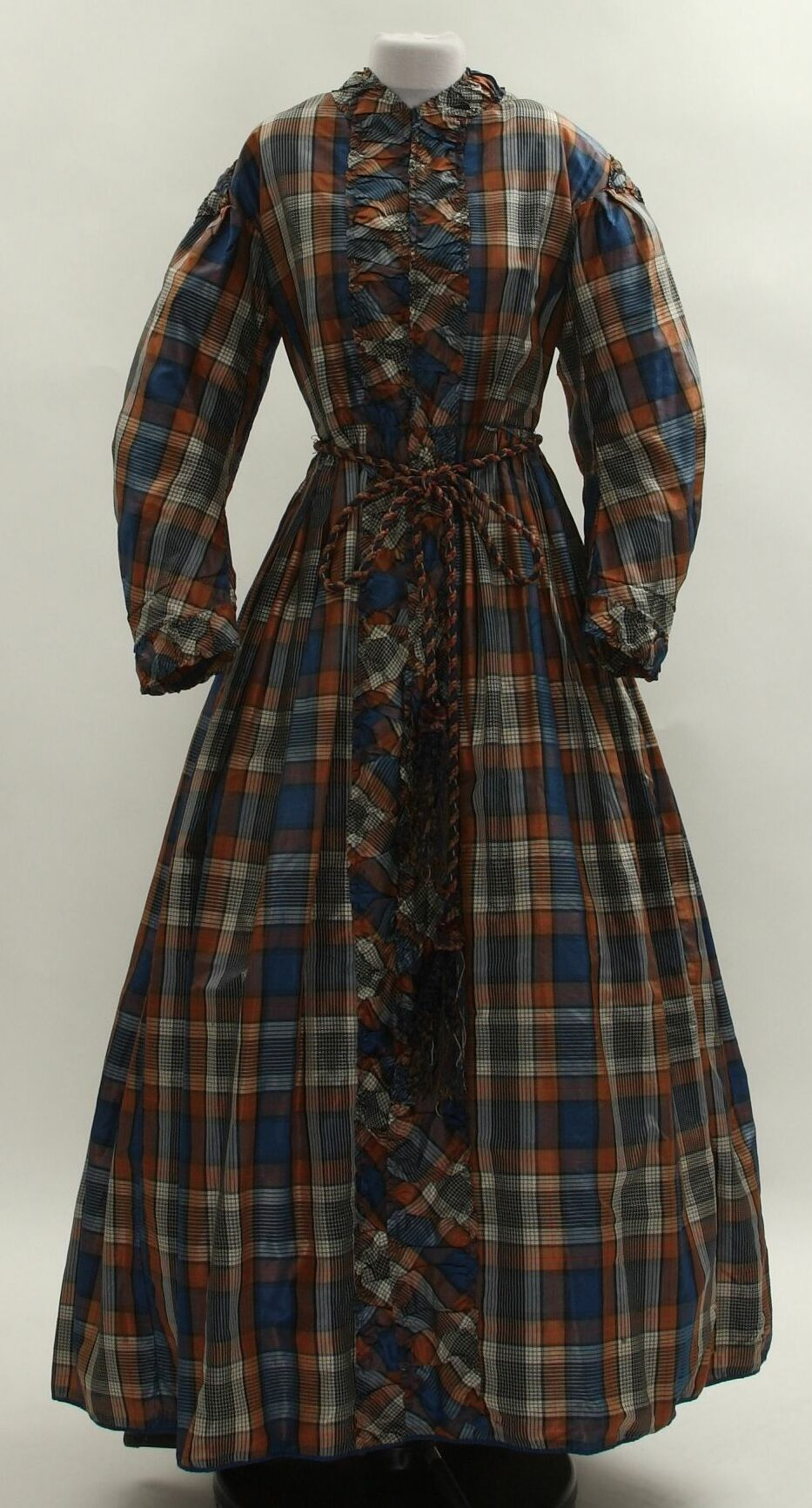
Plaid silk wrapper (Western)

== In the West ==
In the UK and North America, wrapper is also an older term for an informal house garment. Today, words such as housecoat and bathrobe (US) or dressing gown (UK) are usually employed instead.

== Informal fabrics ==
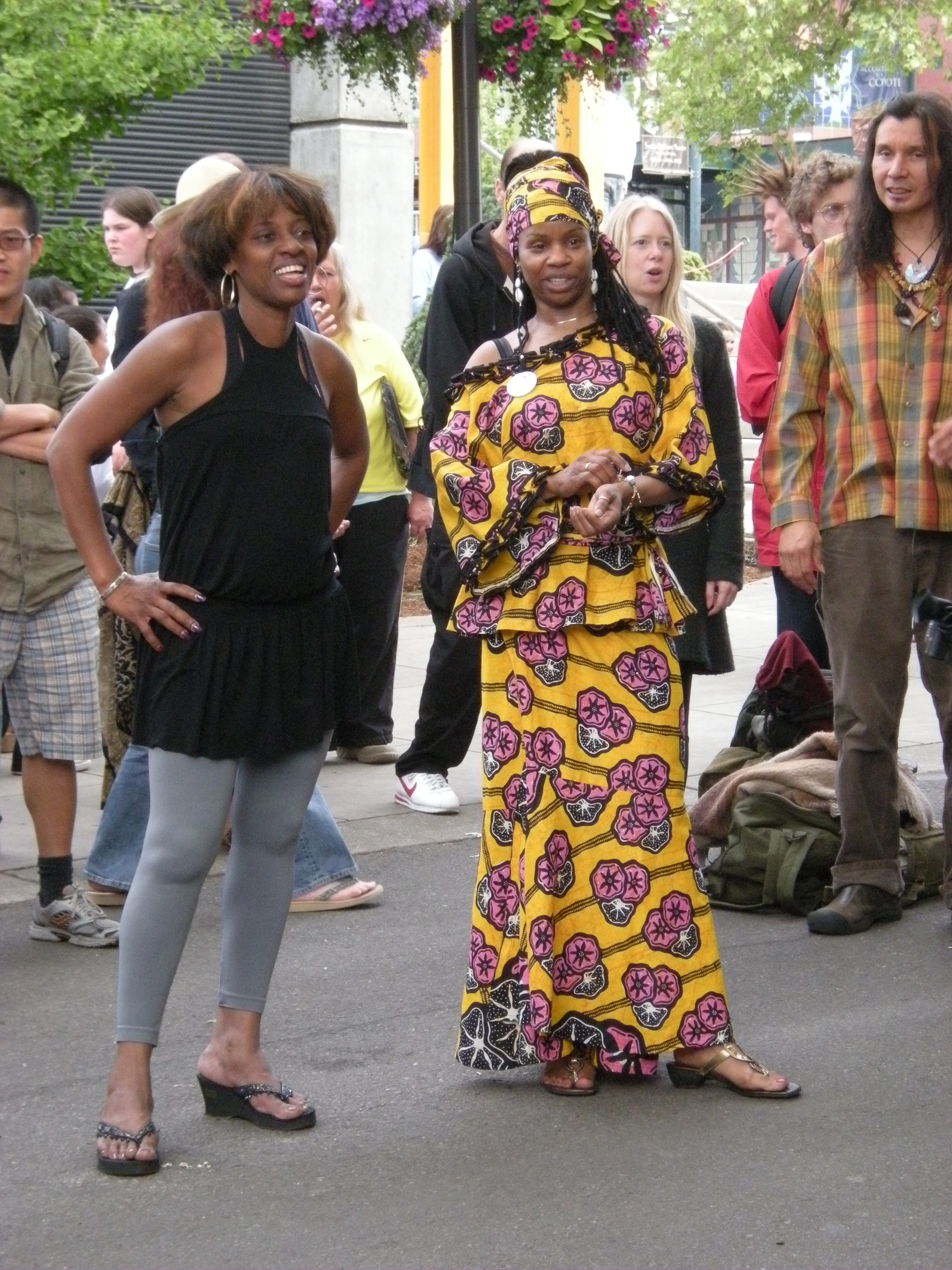
A woman wearing a blouse and skirt set, right.

- Batik—created with hot wax and dye.
- Fancy print—created by printing patterns on cloth. Unlike expensive wax prints, the design is printed on one side of the cotton fabric. Fancy prints are made in Europe, India, and West Africa. The most popular fancy print is known as the traditional print.
- Kente—traditionally woven by men. Kente is an informal fabric for anyone who is not a member of the Akan people. For Akans and many Ewes, kente is a formal cloth.
- Mudcloth—created by making mud drawings on cotton.
- Tie-dye—made by resist tying cotton then dipping in dye. In Nigeria, tie-dye is known as adire cloth.

== Formal fabrics ==
- Adire—A clothing of the Yoruba people of Nigeria
- African wax prints—traditional cloths in Africa. Most of them are printed in West Africa and China. Some African waxprints are made in the Netherlands, known as Dutch wax. In earlier times these were also produced in Great Britain. In a wax print, the pattern or design is printed on both sides of the cotton fabric. Waxprints are more expensive than fancy prints. Famous manufacturers are Vlisco in the Netherlands, Akosombo Textiles Limited in Ghana and Hitarget in China. Some smaller companies still produce genuine African wax prints. A well known brand is ABC Wax from Manchester, UK. Today ABC Wax is part of Akosombo Textiles Limited and printed in Ghana. There are many companies in Africa and China which use the wax print design for similar looking and much cheaper fancy textiles.
- Akwa Ocha —Worn and woven by the Igbo people of Nigeria.
- Akwete—Worn and woven by the Igbo people of Nigeria.
- Aso Oke fabric—Woven by men, see Yoruba people of Nigeria.
- Aso Olona—Worn and Woven by the Yoruba people of Nigeria.
- Cotton brocade—most brocade is produced in Guinea. Brocade is a shiny and polished cotton fabric.
- Jioji cloth- worn and woven by Igbo people, inspired by Indian madras. The Igbo people are known for their Jioji wrappers.
- Isiagu—Worn by the Igbo people of Nigeria.
- Lace—also known as shain-shain cloth.
- Linen—linen kaftans are a formal style.
- Satin—satin fabrics are suitable for formal wear.
- Ukara-Igbo— a traditional indigo-dyed textile made and worn by the Igbo people.

== Wedding attire ==
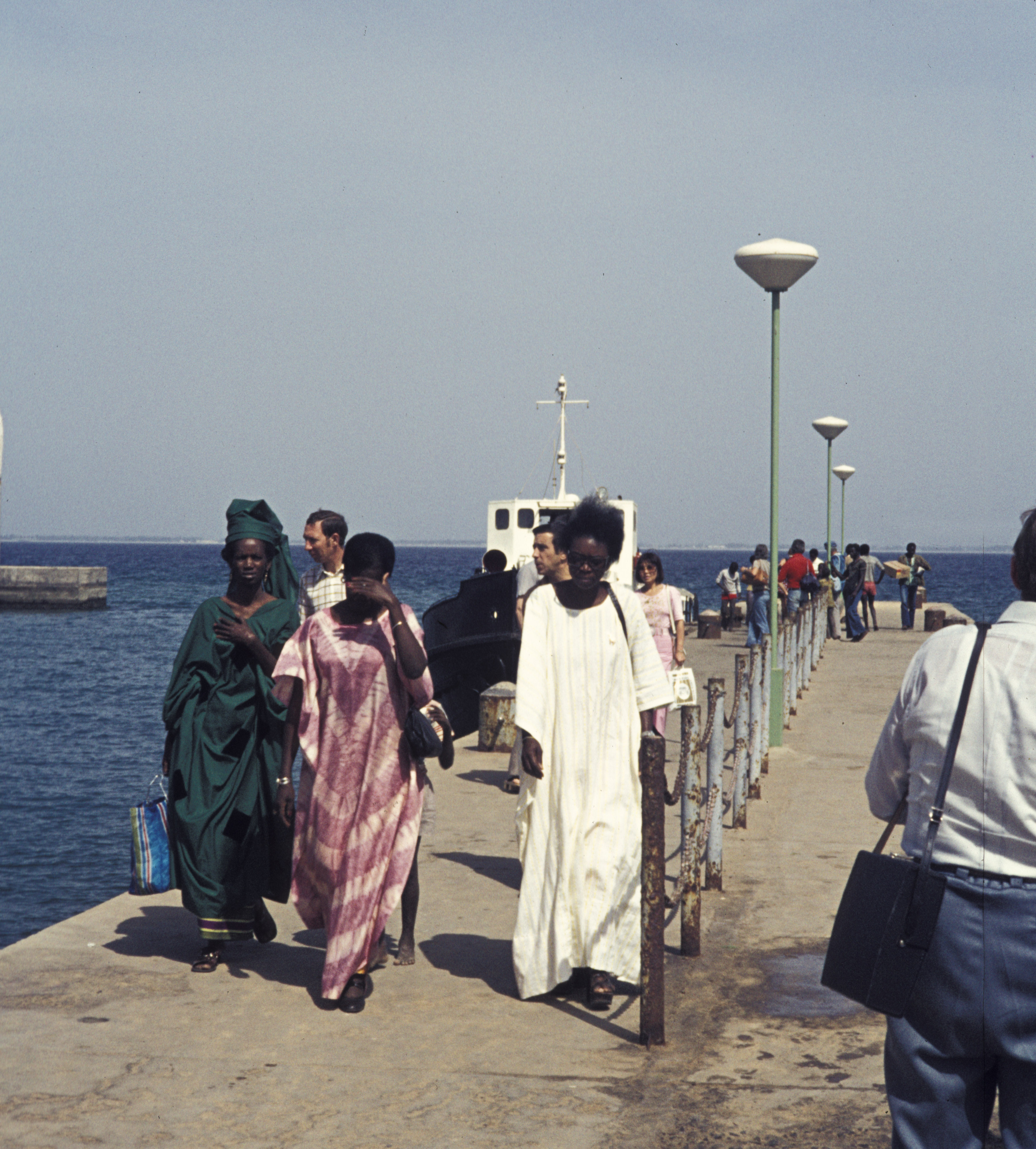
A group of women wearing kaftans, also known as boubous, in Senegal, West Africa in 1974.

The kaftan is always worn with a headscarf or head tie. During a wedding ceremony, the bride's kaftan is the same color as the groom's dashiki. The traditional color for West African weddings is white. The most popular non-traditional color is purple or lavender, the color of African royalty. Blue, the color of love, is also a common non-traditional color. Most women wear black kaftans to funerals. However, in some parts of Ghana and the United States, some women wear black-and-white prints, or black and red. The kaftan is the most popular attire for women of African descent throughout the African diaspora. African and African-American women wear a wide variety of dresses, and skirt sets made out of formal fabrics as formal wear. However, the kaftan and wrapper are the two traditional choices. It is not uncommon for a woman to wear a white wedding dress when the groom wears African attire. In the United States, African-American women wear the boubou for special occasions. The kaftan or boubou is worn at weddings; funerals; graduations; and Kwanzaa celebrations.

The men's robe is also called a boubou, see Senegalese kaftan for further information.

== Buba ==
A buba (pronounced boo-bah) is a top or blouse. Buba is a Yoruba word that means the upper clothing. For women, the buba is worn with the iro (wrapper) and gele (head tie). For men, it is worn with sokoto (trousers) and fila (hat). The buba, sokoto/iro and fila/gele set is the traditional costume of the Yoruba people in South Western Nigeria and the other regions of Yorubaland.

== See also ==
- Akwete
- Dashiki
- Ghanaian smock
- Habesha kemis
- Head tie
- Headscarf
- Kanga (African garment)—This wrapper is worn by women in East Africa
- Kufi
- National costume
- Senegalese kaftan
