= Umuogele (disambiguation) =

Umuogele is a town in Abia State, Nigeria.

It may also refer to:

- Umuogele (Aba South), a village in Aba South local government area, Abia State
- Umuogele (Isiala Ngwa South), a village in Isiala Ngwa South local government area, Abia State
- Umuogele (Obioma Ngwa), a village in Obioma Ngwa local government area, Abia State
- Umuogele (Ukwa East), a village in Ukwa East local government area, Abia State
- Umuogele (Ukwa East), a village in Ukwa East local government area, Abia State
- Umuogele Ntigha, a village in Isiala Ngwa North local government area, Abia State
