= Jioji cloth =

Ceremonial Igbo cloth

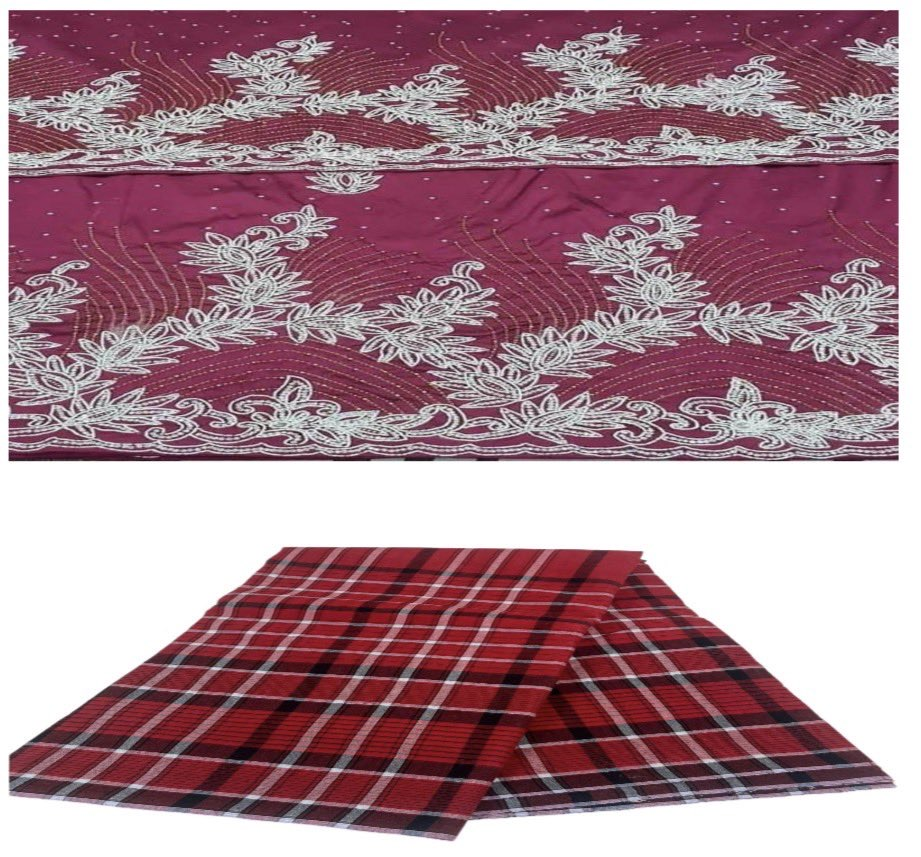
Embroidered jioji and checked jioji clothes

Jioji cloth (Igbo:Jịọjị ;), also known as george cloth, is a striped ceremonial cloth widely worn by the Igbo people, particularly in Akwete and neighbouring communities. The cloth consist of both locally woven ones in Akwete known as Akwete Jioji and imported ones. It is also spelled "jorji" and "joji".

== Origin ==
Jioji cloth is a category of Akwete cloth woven on vertical looms in Akwete whose design was inspired by imported textiles from Madras and Pulicat in India, Igbo weavers adopted and transformed the fabric into a distinctive locally woven cloth.

Jioji is associated with the renowned Akwete weaver Madam Jorji Nmereji Nbokwo, whose family name later changed from Jorji to George (Jioji). Over time, the term came to refer not only to the original Akwete-woven textile but also to a wider range of locally woven and imported striped and silk fabrics used in Igbo dress. A photograph published in Mary Kingsley's narrative in the 1890s recorded jioji cloth being woven at that time Other accounts note that the name derives from Fort St George after the English patron Saint George, while the original patterning featured King George V. According to David Jowitt in his 1991 study, Nigerian English Usage: An Introduction, Jioji is listed as a form of traditional dress alongside others like Akwete, Saki clothes among others.

== Patterns and usage ==
Traditionally woven on vertical looms with fine cotton yarn, Jioji is recognized by its striped and checked patterns and colorful plaid designs with embroidered motifs enclosed in rectangles. it is commonly worn as wrappers by men, while Igbo women wear both wrappers and a blouse sewn from Austrian lace fabric and two yards of richly embroidered matching Hays taffeta head-tie during weddings, festivals, title-taking ceremonies and other important occasions. The cloth symbolizes dignity, wealth, prestige and cultural identity, while its continued use reflects the creativity of Igbo weavers in adapting foreign materials into expressions of local tradition. Jioji clothes are also worn by the Niger-Delta communities in Nigeria such as the Ijaw people.

Jioji cloth also functioned as a currency in Igbo tradition where it is used as part of marriage payments and a crucial part of marriage repertoire in Igbo funeral payments alongside the locally woven Abada cloth, Akwete cloth, gold, brass, Ivory and coral trinkets. Six yards of Jioji is usually worn over the bride in Arochukwu tradition, as she passes through the threshold of her new home.

== See also ==
- Akwete cloth
- Akwa ocha
- Ukara cloth
- Igbo regalia and headdresses
- Igbo culture
