= Umuagbai =

Nigerian town

- Town
- Umuagbai-Ndoki
- Interactive map of Umuagbai
- Founder: Okobo
- Named for: Agbai

Government
  - Type: Traditional Council
  - Body: Mbichiriezi
  - Onyenwe Ala: Chief Nwuche Igwe Nwuche

Umuagbai town is one of the major settlements of the Ndoki people. These towns numbering 54 in total are grouped into seven clans they are Umu Ihueze 1, Umu Ihueze II, Obohia, Ikwueke, Umu Okobo, Ohuru and Mkporobo and Ikwu-Orie-Ato. Umuagbai town is located presently in Oyigbo Local Government Area of Rivers State and is part of the Umu Okobo clan. Umuagbai town is one of the larger communities within the local government area and constitutes an entire Ward on its own; Ward Six. Umuagbai town shares boundary with Akwete in Abia State and the two communities has strong cultural affinities. It is bounded to the south by Azuogu and to the north by Mgboji all in Oyigbo L.G.A while its boundary in the west is to Okwali in Khana Local Government of Rivers State.

== Etymology of the Name Umuagbai ==
The settlement known as Umuagbai was, and is still basically constituted by the children of Okweleze and Agbai, the descendants of Okobo, alongside those adopted wards, together with the Otonis believed to be the aborigines. The name of the town in times past before it was renamed by Jite Agbai (Egbe) was then known as Okobo, which was named after the forebear of the people. It is also important to add here that the name the town bears today as “Umuagbai” had its root from the moment there was an altercation in the line of succession to the throne of Onyenwe Ala of Umuagbai about the 17th century, which resulted in the emergence of Jite Agbai (Egbe) as the fourth in the series of rulers of Umuagbai. The name “Umuagbai” is derived from the words “Umu” meaning“ children” and “Agbai” the name of the man who was the father of Chief Jite. This change of name was done by chief Jite to pay homage to his father. Umuagbai was founded about the 14th century, and this probably explains why C.T.C. Ennals saw Umuagbai as one of the ancestral towns of the Ndokis. However, there has been no archaeological investigation carried to find out how old the village of Umuagbai.

== Traditions of Origin ==
According to some historical sources Okobo crossed over to the southern bank of the Imo River into the community now called Umuagbai from Ohambele. It is speculated that he might have arrived Ohambele alongside Iduma from Abam Ohafia axis. Umuagbai tradition of origin and available documents has proved contrary to this opinion expressed by Nwogu. Again, Nwogu's version is not in accord with the thought system of Umuagbai people, which seems to be in agreement with what was reflected in the Intelligence Report of C.T.C Ennals who report thus: It would appear that the group referred to below as Umu Okobo in their origin were connected with the Ijos, though those who settled in Umuagbai, lost the ability to speak their own language and spoke the language of the Ibo(Igbo)inhabitants with whom they had come in contact with during the course of migration. The implication of this harmony suggests that Umuagbai people originated from an Ijaw homeland. Why this possibility cannot be ruled out as a result of the above statement, though no precise location has revealed whether this immigration was from the Central, Western or Eastern-Delta which are the homelands of the Ijaws. But their thought-pattern, sounds reasonable in view of what C.T.C. Ennals had reported above.

=== Alternative Theories ===
However, another account as narrated by the late Chief Godwin Nwauche which was recorded by the late Chief Israel Okere Nwauche revealed where Mgbeke and Eze migrated from to Nembe. Chief Israel Okere Nwauche reported that Eze settled at Obunku while Mgbeke settled at UzoObu-Ochie. Mgbeke begat Okobo, Okobo begat Okweleze and Agbai. Eze migrated from Nembe-Ijaw”. Eze Israel relying on the oral evidence of his late father, Chief (Eze) Godwin Nwauche, reported that they settled at Aniocha in present-day Delta State and moved to Arondizuogu in Abia State where he later followed the small Imo River tributary via Owerrinta as they migrated southward. This account means that apart from the Benin origin, there was also another account of origin which claimed the Central Delta as the dispersal center for the Umuagbai people. However, this recorded claim of Nembe origin did not show any precise location in the Nembe country where the tradition claimed they originated from since Nembe is made up of constituent towns. Again, Nembe recorded history did not reveal any outward movement of a person or persons from the Nembe country to the region of the lower Imo River which is presently occupied by much of the Ndoki population, which included Umuagbai Town. All of these did not mean that such a claim might not have been possible, but there is no evidence to validate this claim of Nembe origin as recorded in 1975. As it was in the case of the origins of Ndoki and Umu Okobo, the language evidence remains as a consistent factor that has led to the suggestion that Umuagbai is not different from the entire clan of Ndoki in their relation to Igbo origin. This suggestion does not translate to any affirmation. However, the thought-pattern of the Ndoki, Umu Okobo and Umuagbai traditions of origin, on the basis of their respective claims of origin, are in contrast with the supposition derived from them. This contrast draws its strong point from the possibility of migrants coming in contact with a dominant group whose culture and linguistic affinity differ and been influenced by the dominant culture, cannot be ruled out. In spite of the fact that there is absence of geographical propinquity, cultural affinity and linguistic proclivity between the people of Ndoki, Umu Okobo and Umuagbai on one hand, and on the other hand, the people of the central delta and Benin where the traditions of origins claimed they migrated from. In its settlement history, Nwaguru's statement is crucial as regards the fact that Okobo, the forebear of Umuagbai village, was not the first to have settled on the land known as Umuagbai.

== Religion and Cultural Activities ==
While most Umuagbai people have embraced Christianity, Traditional activities related to the worship of ancient deities still goes on in tandem with practice of Christianity although the connections between these festivals and the deities have been washed down and most people participate in them in ignorance of there origins. Dances such as Ikoro, Ekpe, Nwutam are still performed annually usually close to Christian holidays such as Christmas and the beginning and the end of the year.

== Industry and Craft ==
Umuagbai is mostly an agrarian society. A mixture of both cash and food crops is cultivated by the people these including, yam, cassava, plantain, banana, cocoa, cocoyam, oil palm etc. Livestock rearing is carried out mostly in a non-commercial manner and is limited native goat and chickens. Other traditional crafts that the people engage in include palm wine tapping, hunting, fishing, canoe building and weaving. Modern occupations such as barbing, hairdressing, tailoring, masonry, carpentry and bicycle repairs is also engaged in by a significant part of the population. Weaving in the community which is mostly carried out by the female population deserve special mention as the famous 'Akuruaku' material is a product of the ingenuity of these women. These craft has evolved from the use of raffia yarn to dyed cotton and silk for producing traditional wrappers, dresses, suits, shirts, chieftaincy regalia and household furnishing.
