= Akwa ocha =

Igbo fabric used in making of attires

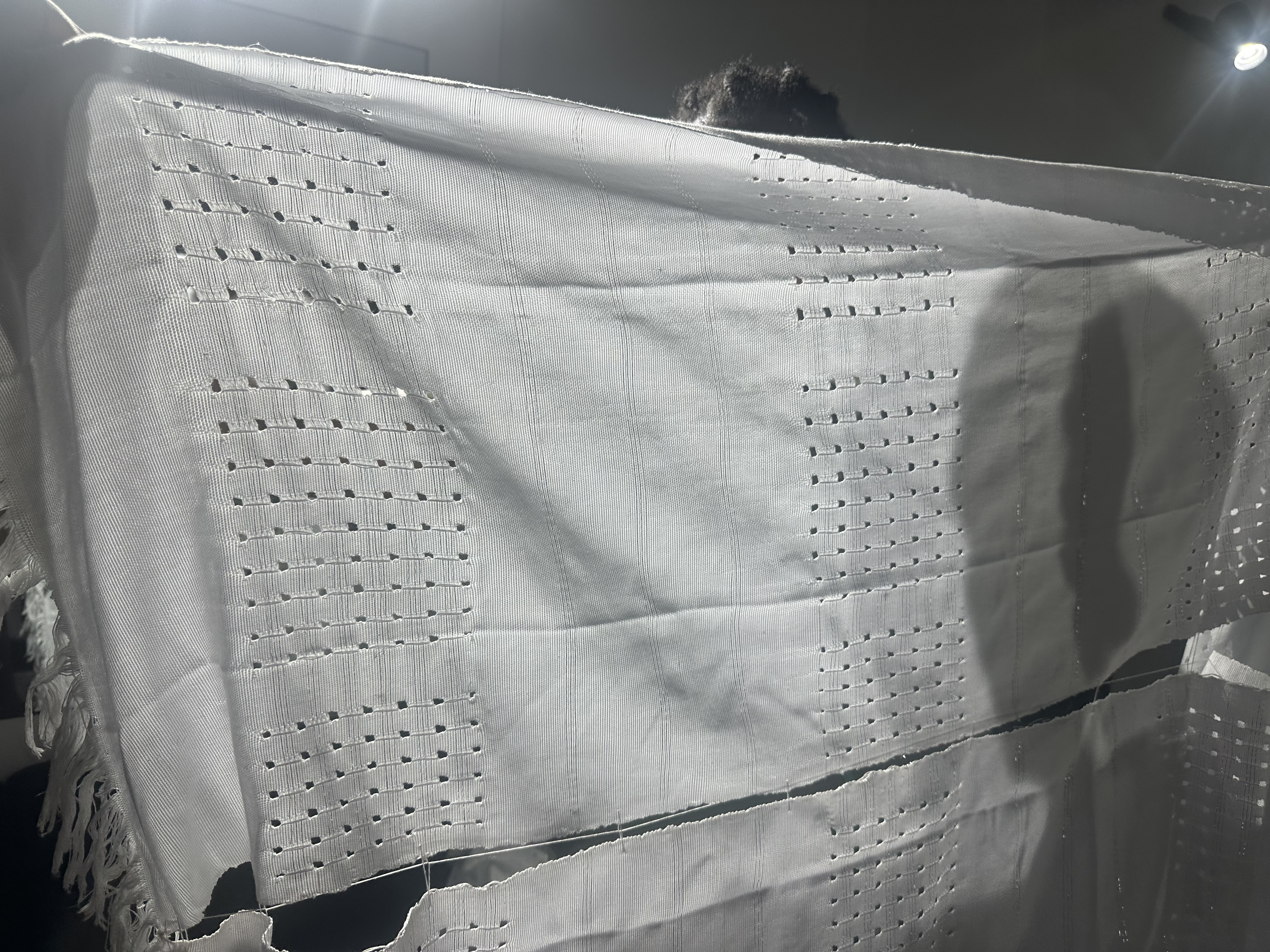
Akwa ocha (hand spun white cloth)

Akwa Ocha (Igbo: Ákwà Ọ̀chá ; ) also called Aguba Ocha is a traditional handwoven textile made by the Igbo people and worn for ceremonial and traditional occasions. It is woven by women on simple vertical single-heddle looms set up in the home. The cloth is characterised by a predominantly white warp background from which its name is derived and by the restrained use of coloured decoration. Although traditionally plain white, some examples incorporate inlay and floating supplementary coloured patterns, while others feature more elaborate weft designs that cover much of the white background but retain the distinctive identity of akwa-ocha and was produced mainly for local traditional use.

Gloria Chuku describes the white cloth as akwa-ocha, while Venice Lamb and Judy Holmes refer to ceremonial white cloths woven by Igbo people in Asaba as aguba ocha. These cloths are woven from finely spun cotton. Many, especially those worn by older women and titled men, have no coloured decoration. Ceremonial akwa ocha cloths are decorated with patterns of holes arranged either in triangular groups (ajo) or in blocks (nkpoko). The decoration may be further developed by adding bands of thickened weft known as okpota. Other Aguba ocha cloths include inlay designs featuring highly stylised motifs such as the hourglass (ugbo-okwe), the double-ended pestle (akangweose), the tortoise (mbekuri), and the check pattern (leke-leke). These inlays are usually arranged in narrow bands so that they do not obscure the predominantly white background. Some older cloths have broader, block-like inlay designs that create an overall red-and-black appearance. Unlike Akwete, where weaving was practised by every woman, not all women wove akwa ocha cloth.

== Production and weaving ==
One of the earliest descriptions of the indigenous manufacturing of White cloth by the Igbo people appears in Taylor and Crowther's 1859 book publication where he stated as follows:

“I took a short walk in the extensive corn and yam plantations… The people of Onitsha… manufactured their own clothes, generally plain or fanciful white. European manufactured goods are not so commonly used here as in the lower parts of the river… On holidays the people appear in their best, in cloths of their own manufacture, from cotton grown on their own farms. Their cloths are nearly all white…”

— Taylor and Crowther

These cloths were described as the work of Igbo weavers and they were on sale in Onitsha market. While Venice lamb noted concentration of the cloth production in Asaba and the nearby town of Ubulu-uku among others in his fieldwork of 1979.

Akwa ocha weaving differed from the weaving tradition of Akwete in several ways. Unlike Akwete cloth, which was produced for a wider market, Akwa ocha was woven mainly for local traditional use. Its white background distinguished it from Akwete textiles, in which other colours predominated. Weaving was concentrated in Asaba and the nearby town of Ubulu Ukwu. The craft was carried out by specialist weavers, who were usually members of families that had practised weaving for generations. Fieldwork conducted in 1979 recorded about sixty women weavers in Ubulu-Ukwu, around twenty in Asaba, and a smaller number in neighbouring villages. Some experienced weavers, particularly in Ubulu-Ukwu, also accepted girls from non-weaving families as apprentices.

Women in the Asaba area controlled every stage of weaving, including the marketing of finished cloth. Some worked as full-time weavers, while others combined weaving with other occupations. One example was Madam Attoh, who learnt weaving in Ubulu-Ukwu at the age of ten before returning to Asaba to work as a schoolteacher. She continued weaving in her spare time, encouraged girls at her school to learn the craft, ensured that her daughters also learnt to weave, and gave practical weaving demonstrations in her classroom using a portable loom. She knew thirteen basic weaving patterns, including leke-leke (basket weave), which, although not traditional to Asaba, was widely used for making baby ties. Madam Attoh built her own loom, except for the sword, which was carved from hardwood by her brother. Like many Nigerian women weavers, she regarded the sword as an important part of the loom and intended it to be passed on to one of her daughters.

A distinctive feature of the Akwa ocha loom is its heddle, which uses one or more cane heddle sticks instead of the raffia rib commonly found on other looms. The loom also has an additional shed stick to make inlay weaving easier. The sword is usually made from the wood of the udala tree and its handle is often carved with rows of notched triangles. While the sword may be used by several generations of weavers, the remaining parts of the loom normally last for about ten years before the major components need to be replaced. Like the Akwete loom, the Akwa ocha loom uses a small metal tool called ukoti to straighten warp threads and lift the inlay threads. The loom may be set up inside a house or on a verandah, and portable looms made by carpenters were also used in the area. The principal parts of the loom are nmsu (loom with uprights), ukpoko (horizontal beams), afia (heddle), apilipa apilipa (sword), ute (tenter), okpa (shuttle), ngugu (shed sticks), and ngbele (supplementary shed sticks)

== Use and symbolism ==
Akwa ocha is worn on ceremonial occasions and remains an important part of traditional dress among the Igbo people. It is commonly worn by elderly men and women in the customary manner, although younger people may also wear western-style clothing depending on the occasion. The cloth is also worn by certain office holders, including the Omu, who wears a white akwa-ocha robe in the performance of her duties, and the Ohene, whose office likewise requires a white garment.

During funeral ceremonies, mourners are expected to wear locally made cloths, preferably woven from hand-spun cotton. The room in which the body is laid is decorated with cloths that have a white background with red and black inlay patterns. During second burial ceremonies, close relatives of the deceased traditionally wear white akwa-ocha while dancing in celebration to bid farewell to the dead. Traditional cloths are also worn at weddings, festivals and other ceremonies. Men usually wear a two-panel cloth around the waist together with a three-panel cloth draped over one shoulder in the style of a toga. Women normally wear two wrappers, one tied around the waist and the other fastened beneath the arms, while a third cloth may be worn as a head tie.

Traditional weaving continues to be highly valued in the Asaba area, and skilled weavers receive as many orders as they can complete. Although spinning is now carried out mainly by older women, most girls still learn the skill and can produce good-quality yarn when needed. Cotton reels and the dried fruit of the ude tree are both used as spindle whorls. Cotton was formerly cultivated around both Asaba and Ubulu-Ukwu, but the principal supply now comes from Ubulu-Ukwu and is usually brought to Asaba already spun.

== See also ==
- Akwete cloth
- Ukara cloth
- Jioji cloth
- Igbo regalia and headdresses
- Anioma Region
