= Gèlè Festival =

Celebration of Yoruba women's head tie

- Gele on a model
- Status: Active
- Genre: Cultural festival, Arts festival, Fashion event, Empowerment
- Date: November 8, 2026
- Venue: Eko Amore Garden, Lekki
- Location: Lagos
- Country: Nigeria
- Inaugurated: 2026; 0 years ago
- Organizer: Lagos State Government
- Website: gelefestival.org

The Gèlè Festival a.k.a. Lagos Gele Festival is a cultural and empowerment event inaugurated by the Lagos State Government in November 2026 to celebrate Gele, the traditional Yoruba female head tie now popular and worn throughout Nigeria and worldwide, and enhance skill-building, particularly among women and young people. The festival's website describes it as; "among the most remarkable textile inventions in the history of African fashion".

The festival brought together various fashion designers, cultural enthusiasts, entertainers as well as national and international guests to showcase their artistry and creativity through Gele styling and designs. A prize money of ₦2 million (Two million Naira) was awarded to the winning design.

Beyond the display of culture, the state government said the festival was also designed to promote Gele styling as a source of gainful employment and income, particularly for women and the state's youthful population.

== History ==
The Gele is an elaborate form of head-tie traditionally worn by Yoruba women at outings and events such as weddings, religious gatherings and other important occasions, and has remained a prominent staple of the region's fashion and cultural identity for centuries.

The government, through the Lagos state special advisor on Tourism, Arts and culture Idris Aregbe, attributed the festival's beginning to a letter by a resident urging the state to recognize and preserve the traditional fashion accessory by including it in the state's annual cultural events calendar.

According to him, the festival was therefore strategically established to amplify discussions around the Gele, and recognize the efforts of stylists, fabric makers, photographers and women who have sustained the Yoruba culture over many years,

In his words:

Number one is about protecting our culture, protecting what the Yoruba believes in. The Gele itself is something very unique to us. It is something we use to celebrate, use for style, and use to enhance the beauty of our mothers and women. Some of these headwraps carry deep cultural interpretations. We came up with the Gele Festival to amplify conversations around this heritage and appreciate the master stylists who have spent years innovating the unique designs we see every day.

== See also ==
- Yoruba clothing
- Gele (headdress)
- Aso oke
- List of festivals in Nigeria
