= Ukwa East =

Coordinates: 4.8872°N 7.3572°E

Ukwa East Eastern Oil Land
- LGA
- Interactive map of Ukwa East
- Country: Nigeria
- State: Abia State
- Capital: Akwete

Government
  - Local Government Chairman: Hon Chibunna Akara(from Ohuru Ndoki)
  - Local Government Deputy Chairman: Dr Thelma Ekeke

Area
  - Total: 280 km^{2} (110 sq mi)

Population (2006)
  - Total: 58,139
  - Density: 210/km^{2} (540/sq mi)
- Time zone: UTC+1 (WAT)
- Postal code: 452
- Secretary to the Local Government: Pst Iheanyi Adindu

Ukwa East is a Local Government Area located in Abia State, Nigeria. Its headquarters is in the town of Akwete. Ukwa East is bordered by Akwa Ibom State and Rivers States.

It has an area of 280 km^{2} and a population of 58,865 at the 2006 census. It has 10 political wards recognised by the Abia State Independent Electoral Commission (ABSIEC), a body that conducts national elections for Nigeria and 14 political wards recognised by the Abia State Independent Electoral Commission, a body that conducts elections for Abia State. Ukwa East shares Azumini border with Akwa Ibom State.

The postal code of the area is 452.

== Geography ==
The average temperature of Ukwa East LGA, which covers an area of 280 square kilometres (110 mi^{2}), is 26 °C (79 °F). The well-known Azumini Blue River flows within the LGA's borders, and the region's typical wind speed is estimated to be 10 km/h (6.2 mph).

== Economy ==
Little crude oil is found in the Ukwa East LGA. The LGA is well known for weaving the well-known Akwete Cloth. Aside from farming, trade, animal husbandry, fishing, and wood carving, Ukwa east LGA also engages in significant economic activities.

== Localities ==
Towns and Villages in Ukwa East:

- Ala-Ukwu
- Azumini
- Ibeme
- Ikwueke
- Ikwuo-Rieator
- Ntigha-uzo
- Obohia
- Umuigbube-Achara
- Umuihu-Eze 2
- Ohuru
- Ikwu-orie
- Abayi
- Akuma-Imo
