= Ukara cloth =

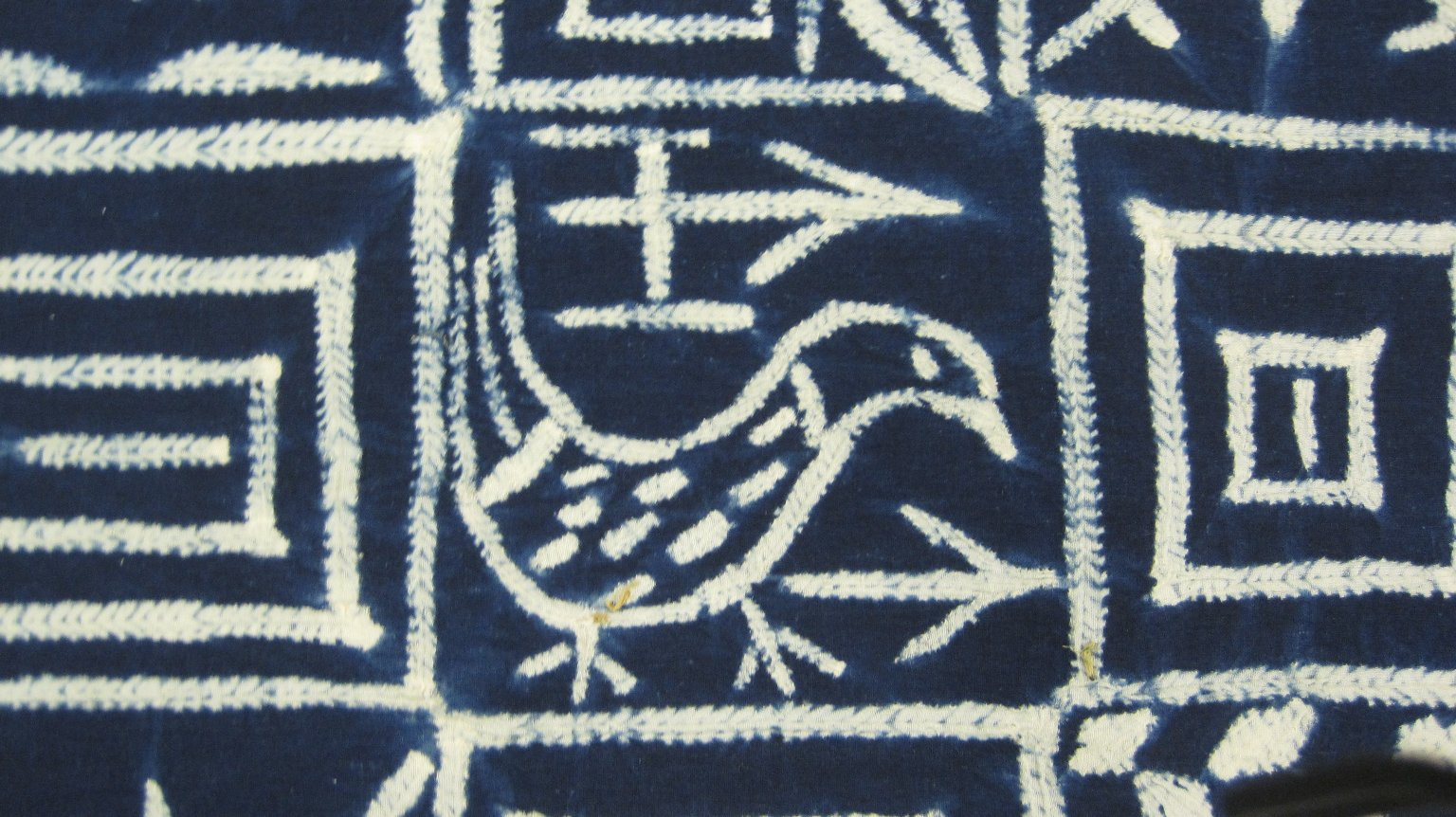
Detail on an Ukara cloth held by the Brooklyn Museum.

Ukara cloth , commonly known as Ukara Igbo cloth or Ukara-Igbo, is a traditional indigo-dyed textile made by the Igbo people of southeastern Nigeria. The cloth is distinguished by its deep blue surface decorated with white Nsibidi symbols, geometric patterns, and stylised representations of animals and plants. It is traditionally associated with the Ekpe society, where it is worn by initiated members and used as ceremonial regalia, while also serving as a symbol of rank, authority and identity.

In addition to its use among the Igbo, Ukara is also used by the Efik, Ejagham (Ekoi), Ibibio, Oron and other communities of the Cross River region, as well as in parts of western Cameroon where the Ekpe institution is practised. Ukara is traditionally worn as a wrapper by high-ranking members of the Ekpe society. It is also used as a backdrop in the throne rooms of chiefs and kings. Its motifs serve as a coded means of communication among members of the Ekpe society.

== Production and weaving ==
Ukara has traditionally been produced through a combination of weaving, stitching and indigo dyeing. Earlier accounts identify Abakaliki as one of the main centres of its production. The cloth was woven by men, while craftsmen from Ohafia, Abiriba and Arochukwu prepared its decorative patterns. The stitched cloth was then dyed with indigo by postmenopausal women, who carried out this work under customary restrictions because of the cloth’s sacred association with the Ekpe society. Traditional practice permitted only titled women and postmenopausal women to take part in this stage of production.

The cloth is used in a variety of Ekpe ceremonies beyond being worn as dress. It appears in some masquerade costumes, including those of the Nkanda society. During the burial of an Ekpe member, Ukara may be erected as part of a tent-like structure, while the walls of the deceased’s house are decorated with the cloth. When displayed in Ekpe lodges, it marks the area reserved for initiated members and represents the presence and authority of the society.

== Motifs and designs ==
The various motifs used in ukara cloth are namely: the tortoise motif, the hand (ikaka) motif, python motif, crocodile motif, leopard motif, sunflower motif, among others. On ukara cloth, within the Ekpe society, the tortoise motif signifies resilience and determination , the hand motif signifies power and capability, the python motif represents sacredness, spiritual power and protection, the crocodile motif on signifies power and adaptability, the leopard motif represents bravery, strength, authority and leadership and the sunflower motif signifies hope, positivity, vitality and resilience.

== See also ==
- Akwete
- Akwa ocha
- Igbo regalia and headdresses
- Nsibidi
- Igbo culture
