= Gele (headdress) =

Traditional head tie native to Yoruba women

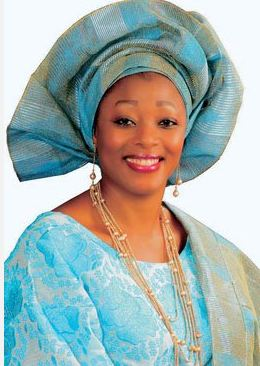
Yoruba Nigerian politician Funmilayo Olayinka wearing Gele

Art of Joke Silva in Gele

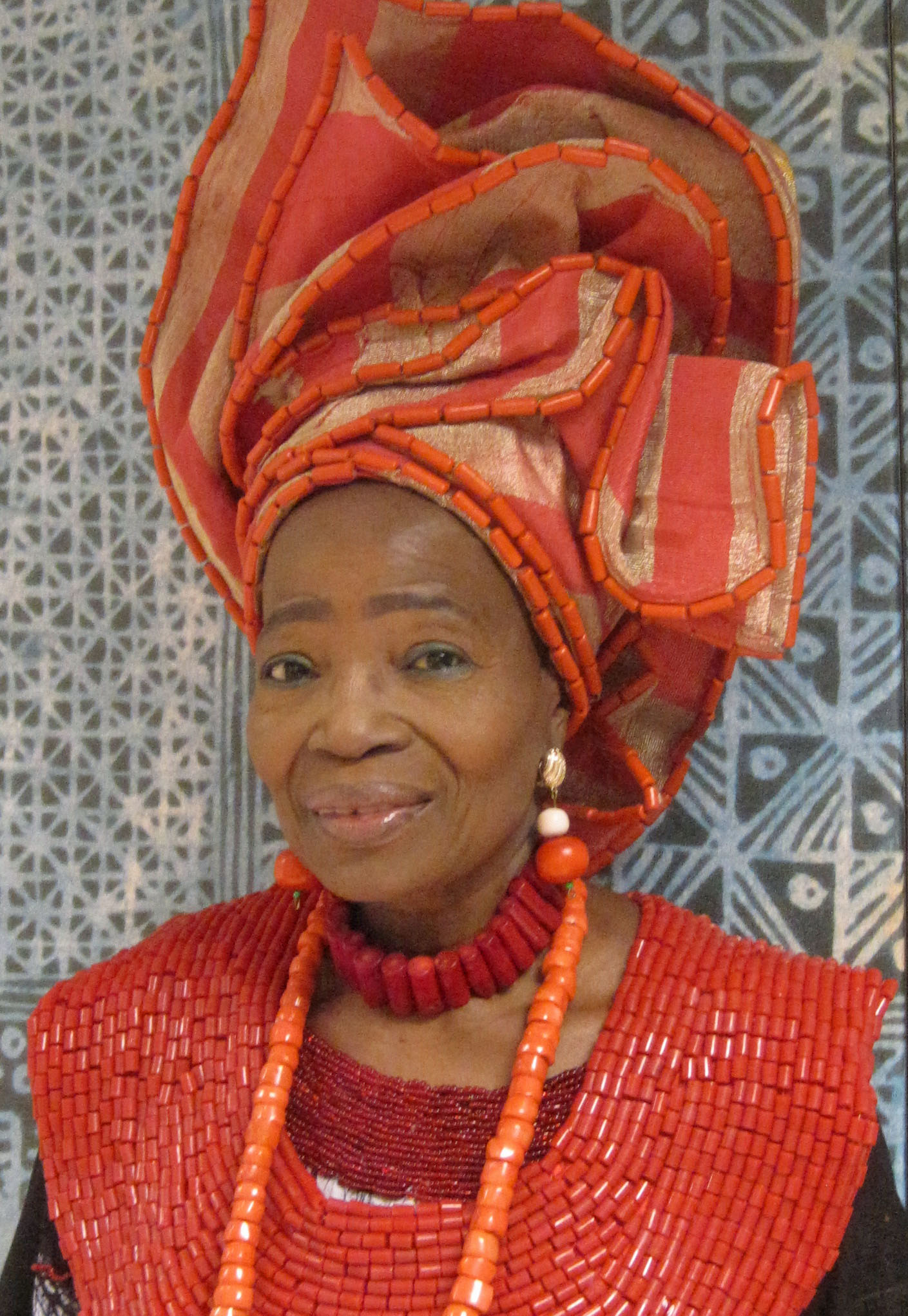
Chief Nike Davies-Okundaye in a beaded Gele

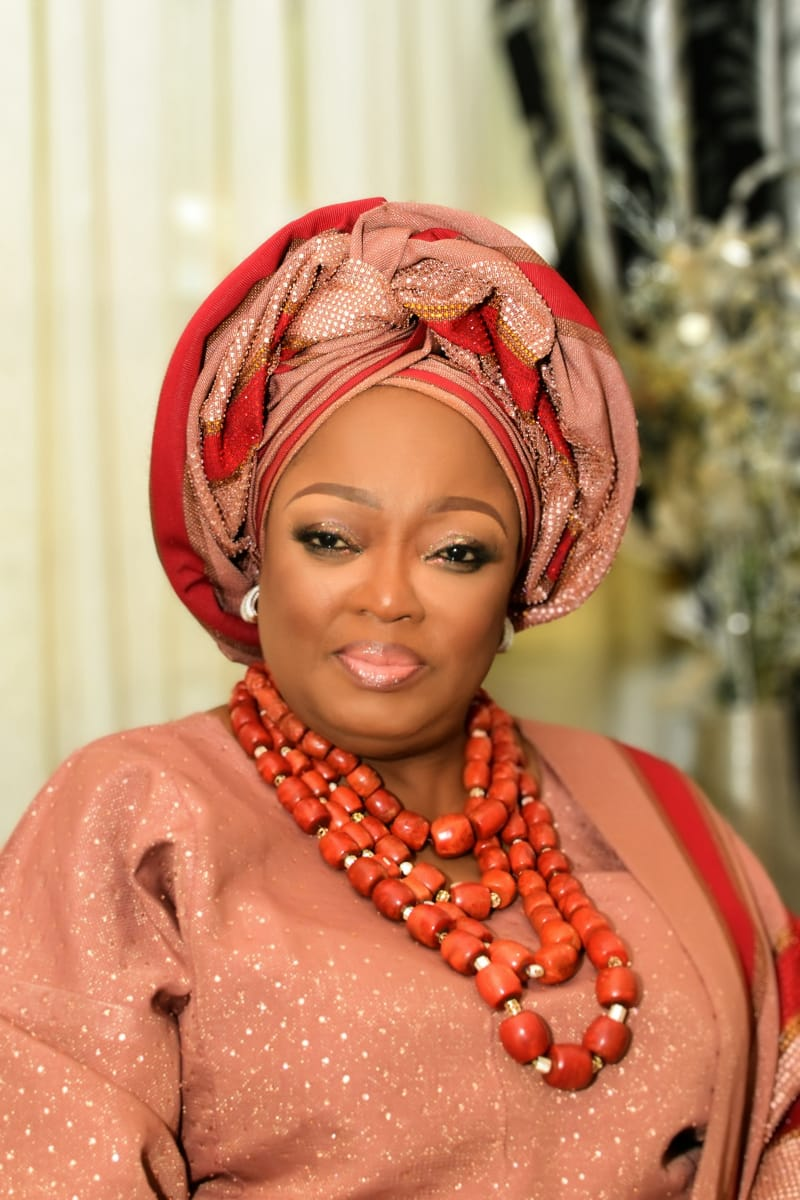
Iyalode Adesewa Okunuga

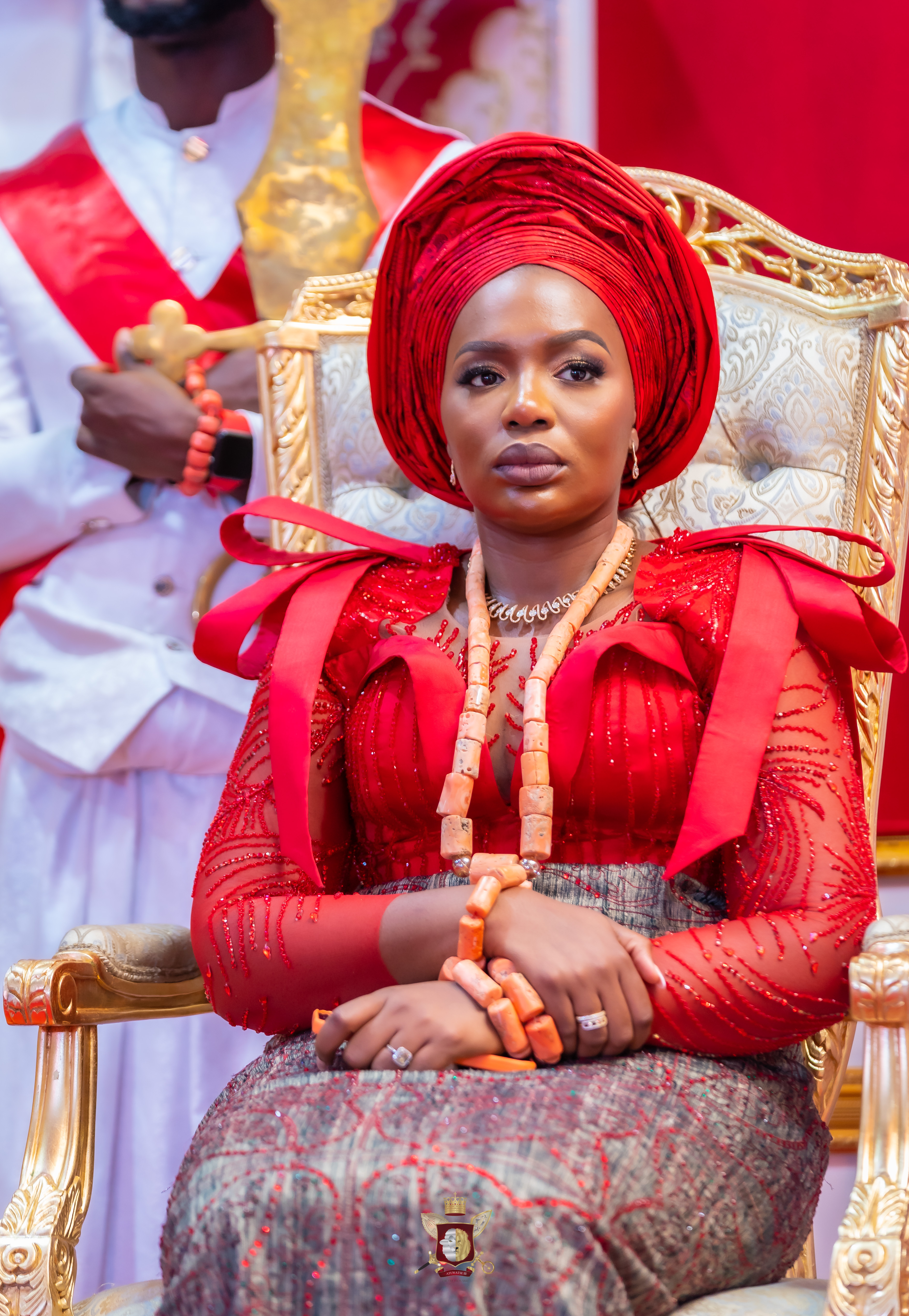
Olori Atuwatse III

The Gele (Yoruba: Gèlè) is a traditional head tie and headdress native to the Yoruba people of Nigeria, Benin, and Togo. The word ‘Gele’ means "to be elevated, raised above the surface", from (Yoruba: ga, ele) lit.: high, an eminence.

Often distinguished from the simple kerchief, it is a voluminous headtie, sometimes towering several feet above the head. It is worn for any assortment of occasions, not only restricted to ritualistic or ceremonial context; rather it is often worn when visiting friends, attending parties, or going to the market. Other types of cloth head coverings in Yoruba culture that are not Gele include Ibori, which is regular head scarf, and Iborun, which is a shawl; these are all distinct from the Gele.

== Design ==
Gele, leaf sub-type made with Aso-Oke

Fan Gele/ Gele Abebe

Gele can be tied in different styles from a pleating foundation, that generally change based on the fashion trends. In the 1960s, some were fashioned after high-rise buildings such as the Cocoa House, these styles were known as Onílégogoro lit.:skyscraper. Popular contemporary styles include; Fan Gele, Infinity pleats Gele, Rose Gele, Centre knot Gele, Peacock Gele, Centre bow Gele, Ruffle Gele, and many more.

Sego Gele - Made with Damask or shiny fabric. Also Damask Gele

While the manual Gele designs are achieved through pleating and pinning, some Gele, called "Auto-Gele," are made ready-to-wear, like a hat, so that the wearer does not need to tie it each time. Despite its popularity as a result of its ready to wear solution, it is considered the worse option to the manual Gele, mainly for its lack of fine art credibility.

Aso-Oke Gele

Gele is usually made from Aso-oke, however they can also be made in Adire, Aso-olona, Damask, Brocade, Sego, Seghosen, and Jawu. The fabric chosen typically match the fabric being used for the main traditional women's outfit, but they can also be an entirely different pattern to create a more unique look.

=== Tradition as an architect of art ===
The practise of Gele sprang from fundamental Yoruba beliefs about the sacredness of the head and its role in defining aspects of personhood.

A traditional saying among the Yoruba goes; Orí eni l’ aláìírí ẹni, that is, “One’s head is the envelope for one’s secrets.” It was therefore common to admonish a person, especially a young girl who did not wear a headdress, that Asiri rel le bo, “your secret cannot be kept.” In other words, covering the head plays a protective role of hiding the secrets of an individual. This saying has had what Michael Oladejo and Betty Wass describe as a lasting psycho-spiritual implication, since in the past, the taboo was taken seriously by those in the traditional society.

The belief signifies that the Yoruba headdress covers for two separate but related entities: the physical head, and the sacred head. Just as the primary intention of styling hair is to honor the head, the dressing of the head is an extension of that honor, both spiritually and aesthetically. As such, the head is treated like a temple or a shrine, which houses a spiritual entity. The decoration of this entity cultivated a culture of artistic self expression and patience, where different fashion trends ebbed and flowed. The origin of a Gele style was sometimes traceable. A prominent woman, like the wife of a political leader, could arrange the Gele into a form that was admired and emulated to the extent that the shape would be named after her. Demonstrations of how to tie the latest Gele styles became a feature on Nigerian television. For cultural historians Chris Filstrup and Jane Merrill;

To fashion a Gele is to make a sculpture.

This constructive relationship between thought systems and visual expression attracted study from professional artists such as Sonya Clark, who—for her exhibition at the University of Iowa Museum of Art in 2001 titled, "African Inspirations:Sculpted Headwear"—became preocuppied with the Gele's relation as a locus for showing reverence to the sacred head. This reverence was thought by the Yoruba to be the most important part of one's humanity.

== History ==
In the Ifa Literary Corpus, the Odu 'Ose-Otura' as read by Chief Ifa priest Solagbade Popoola, records the Gele as head gear in one of its verses;

Yoruba

Penpe lese’e tubu
Ala agemo ni o to gele
I ba to gele
Bee ni ko too weri

Translation:
English

Tiny is the leg of the tubu insect
The stripe of Agemo (the chameleon) is not up to headgear
Even if it is up to headgear
it cannot be tied to the head

On headweaps in West Africa, according to Georgia Scott;

"The Yoruba were among the first to wear headwraps as adornments. The idea spread, so that by the 1400s, headwraps of some kind were a firm part of many West African cultures."

=== National Cultural Influence ===
When the Gele was reportedly introduced by a family of Yoruba traders living in Zaria city in the late 1940s, the Hausa began to call it “Gyale”. It has since been adopted into the Hausa Lexicon as a head cover. The Gele is also worn by Igbo women.

In 1944, Anthropologist Sylvia Leith-Ross recorded that a modern change in some Igbo households occurred, were they would allow their daughters to keep the money they earned from work, so that their natural desire to keep up with expensive clothing trends would not lead them astray. An Onitsha born polyglot by the name of Ms. Edwards attributed this change to the introduction of the Yoruba style of head-tie, which needed cloth or silk two yards square, while the Igbo head-tie was half the size, at only one yard square. This extra square yard was allegedly responsible for more immorality than any social change that had taken place, and girls seen wearing two yards were almost deemed unvirtuous for spending money on an extra yard. The wife of a reverend who used only one yard square for her head-tie corroborated the view of Ms. Edwards, and also criticised the appearance of the Yoruba style head-tie for making the head too big for the body, to which Sylvia noted;

“the big Yoruba women can carry off this voluminous head-dress far better than the slimmer Ibo”

In 1955 another anthropologist, Simon Ottenberg, documented that Igbo women from the Afikpo area of southeastern Nigeria who were part of improvement associations, wore the head tie of Yoruba women after travelling to other parts of Nigeria. Nicholas Freville in Nigeria (1985) also made a comparative analysis with pictures of Igbo women and girls in headscarves where he observed that they were notably simpler than the turban-like Gele, whose height made Yoruba women recognisable at a distance.

The Gele is viewed as the National Nigerian Headdress by encyclopedias and art historians. It has become commonplace among women all over Nigeria.

=== International Cultural Diffusion ===
While the Gele remains a feature of major Nigerian occasions, the style has taken on new dimensions among Nigerian-American communities. In Texas, home to the largest Nigerian-American population in the United States, Gele worn at weddings draws participation from many African-Americans who try to maintain an african identity through the use of African textiles.

Yoruba societies are remarked by scholars such as Nicole willson and Georgia Scott, as having set a historical and cultural precedent for head-wrapping traditions across the African diaspora. Nigerian designer Fati Asibelua has incorporated contemporary versions of the Gele into collections blending Nigerian and Western design, and international designers, including Jean Paul Gaultier, have presented their own interpretations of the headwrap.

Nicola Stylianou, a lecturer in textiles, visual arts, art history, observes that in the 21st century, the Gele has become something of an international phenomenon, with women wearing the head tie and retailers selling them appearing in a number of European and American cities. It has been the subject of dedicated exhibitions, including one held by the London College of Fashion in 2005 and another at the University of North Texas in 2012.

== See also ==
- Gèlè Festival
- Fila: Yoruba men's hats and caps
- Yoruba clothing

== Gallery ==
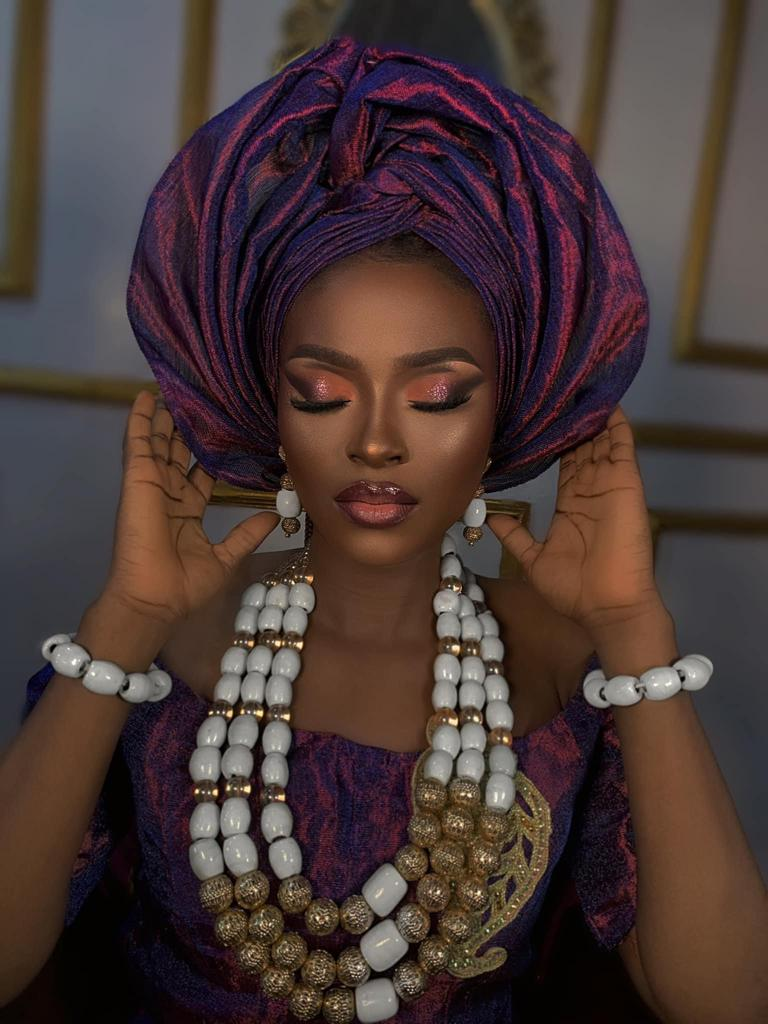

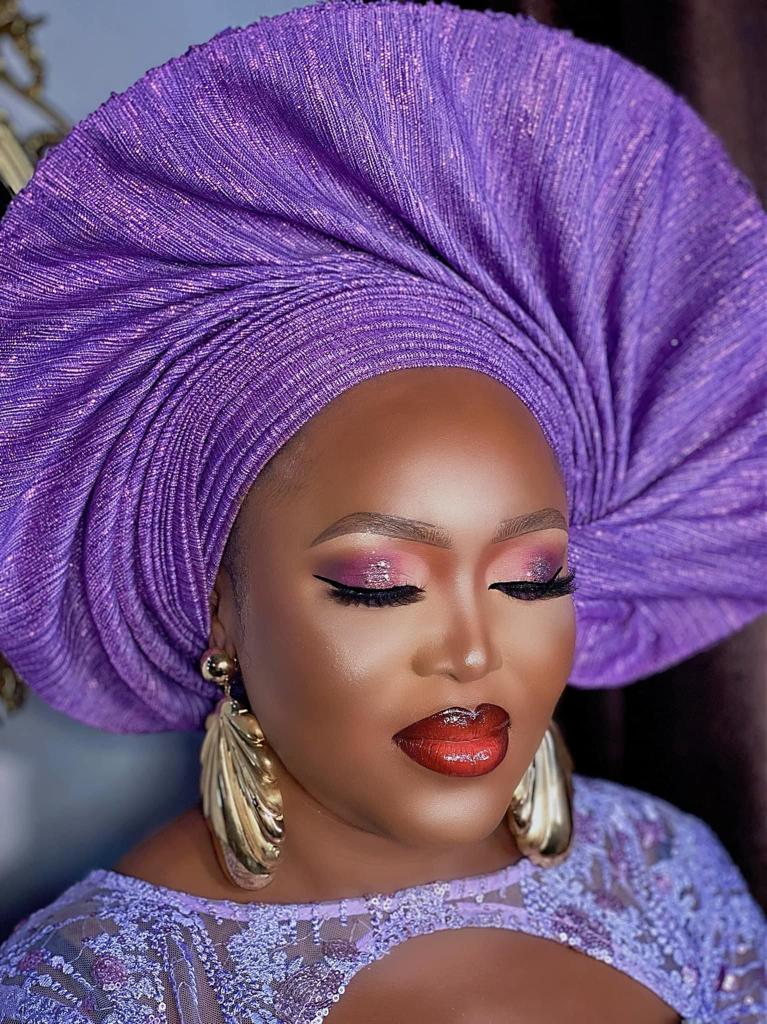

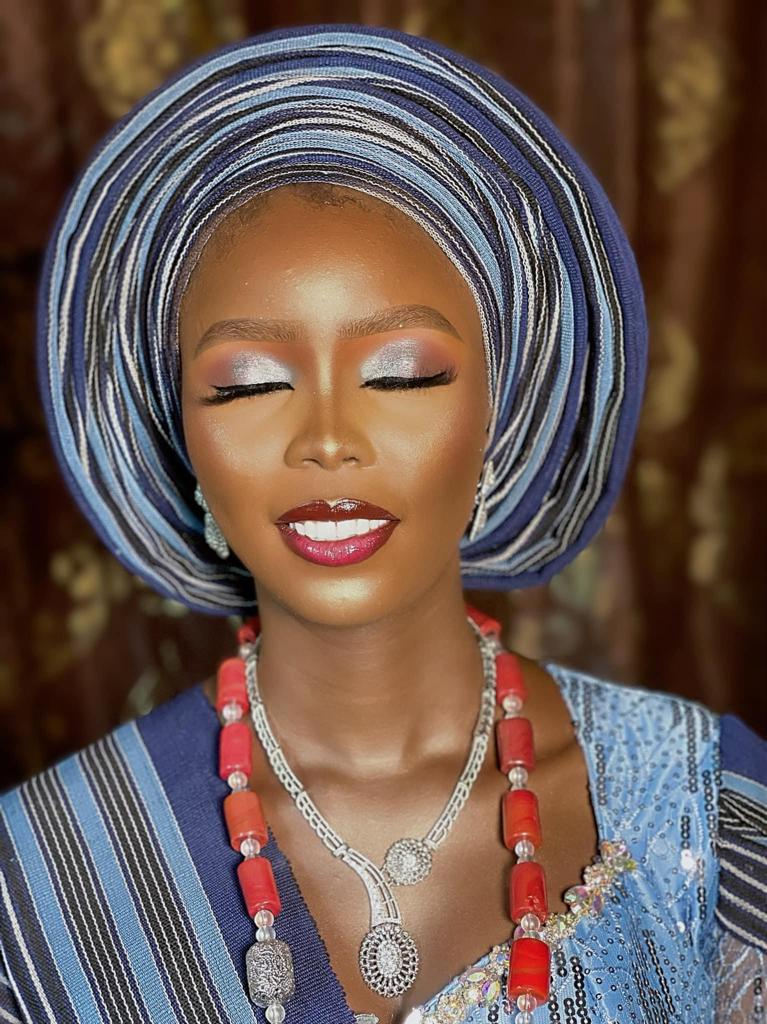

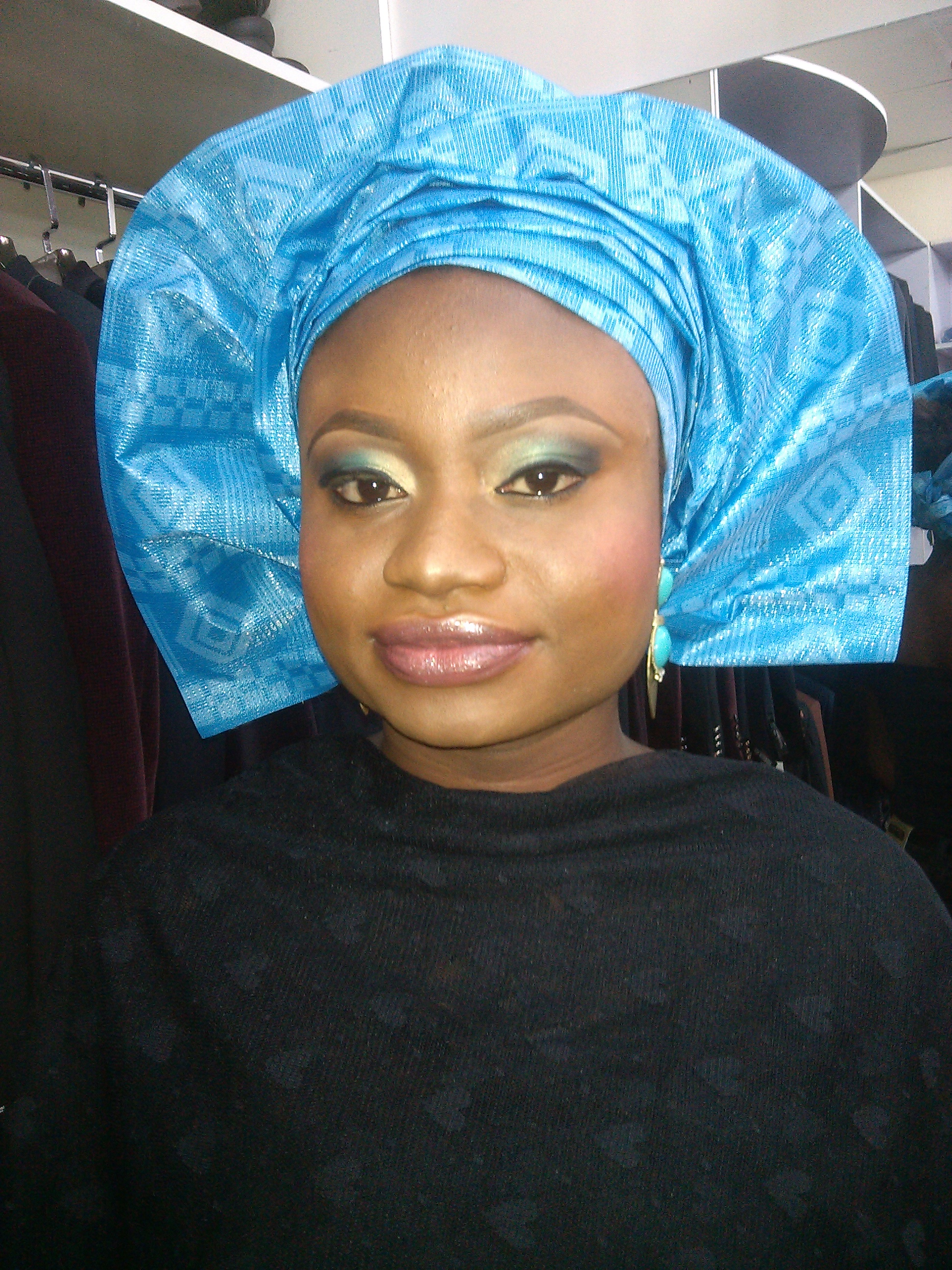

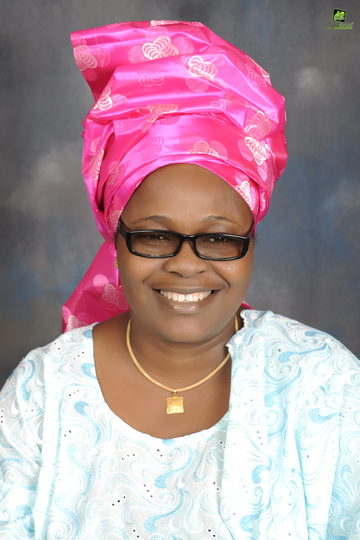

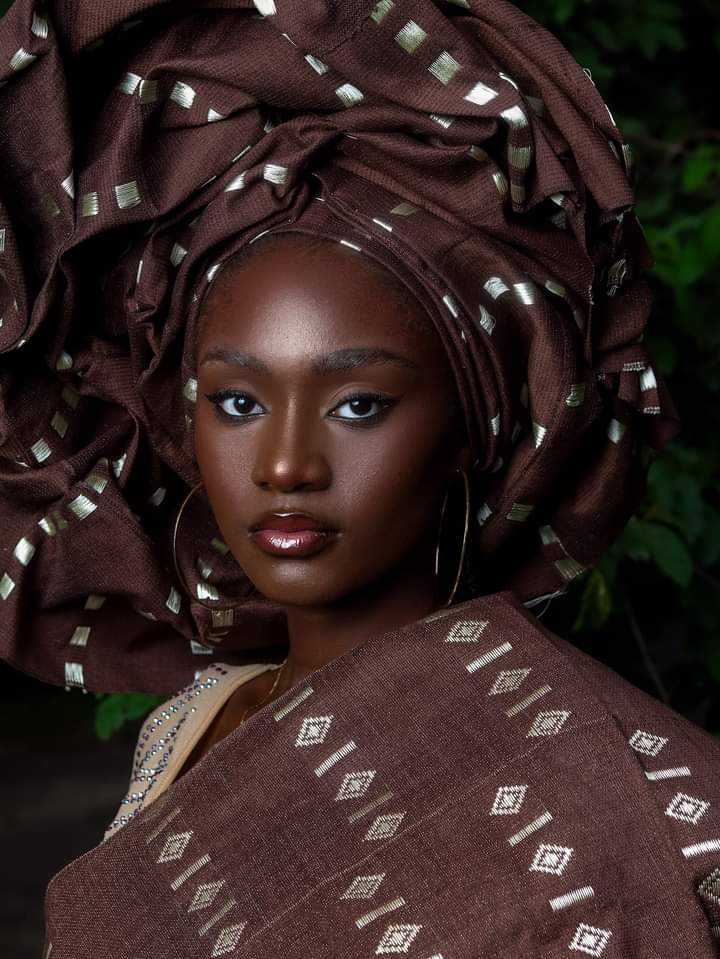

== Bibliography ==
- Lynch, Annette; Strauss, Mitchell D., eds. (2014). Ethnic Dress in the United States: A Cultural Encyclopedia. Rowman & Littlefield. pp. 129–130.
- Arnoldi, Mary Jo; Kreamer, Christine Mullen, eds. (1995). Crowning Achievements: African Arts of Dressing the Head. Fowler Museum of Cultural History, University of California, Los Angeles. pp. 127, 139–145.
- Filstrup, Chris; Merrill, Jane (2025). The Turban: A History from East to West. London: Reaktion Books. ISBN 978-1-83639-074-9.
- Jegede, Dele (2009). Encyclopedia of African American Artists. Artists of the American Mosaic. Greenwood Press.
- Usman, Aribidesi; Falola, Toyin (2019). The Yoruba: From Prehistory to the Present. Cambridge: Cambridge University Press. ISBN 978-1-107-06460-7.
- Oladejo, Mutiat Titilope (2022). A History of Textiles and Fashion in the Twentieth Century Yoruba World. Newcastle upon Tyne: Cambridge Scholars Publishing. ISBN 978-1-5275-7731-2.
- Freville, Nicholas (1999). Nigeria. Major World Nations. New York: Chelsea House Publishers. pp. 22, 23, 25.
- Stylianou, Nicola (2016). Farrelly, Liz; Weddell, Joanna (eds.). Design Objects and the Museum. London: Bloomsbury Academic. p. 42.
- Akinde, Toyin (2023). "Morphology and Signification of Gele Ephemeral Art". Art and Design. 6 (3): 11–23. doi:10.30857/2617-0272.2023.3.1.
