= Head tie =

Women's cloth head scarf

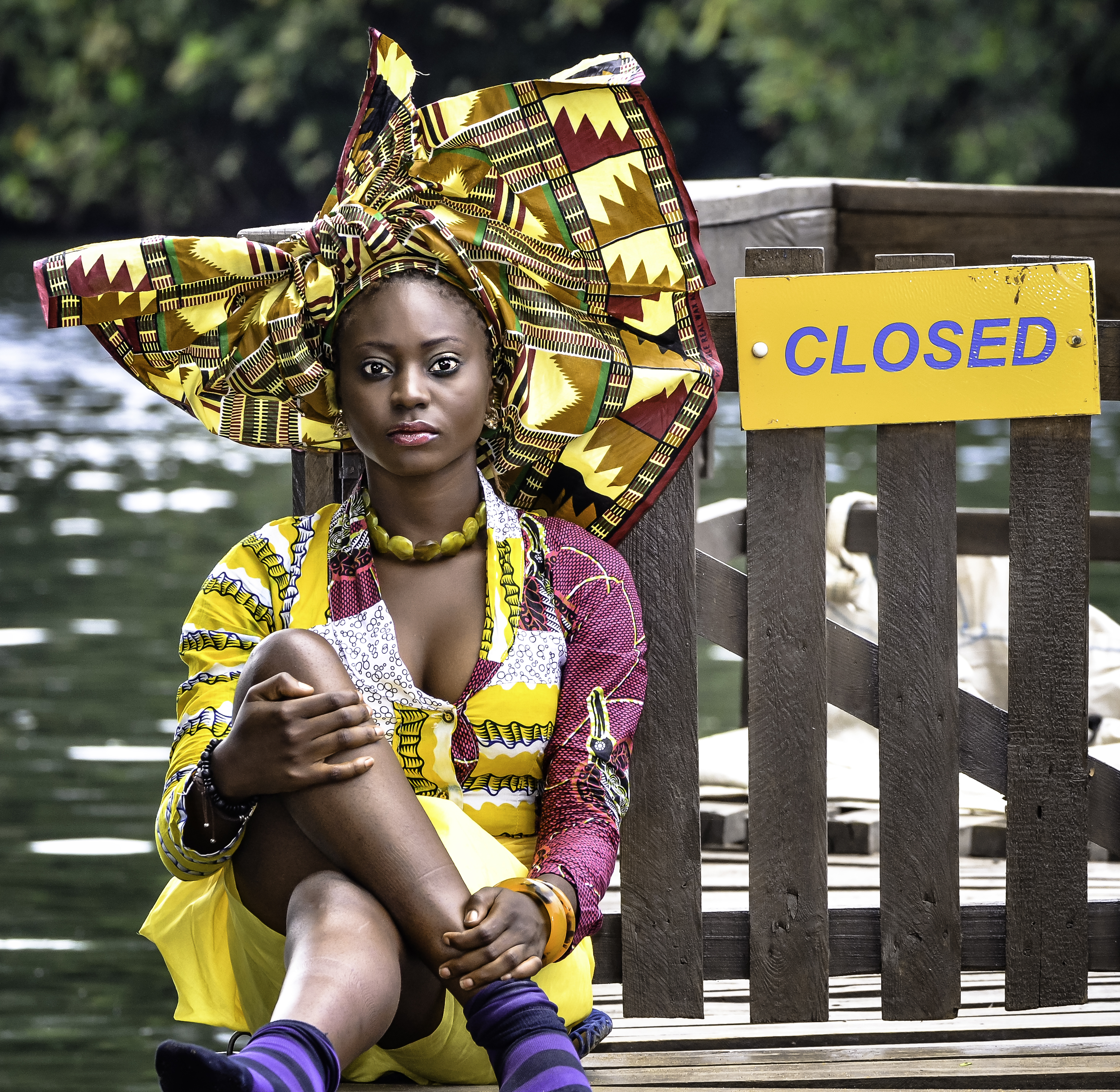
A Ghanaian woman wearing a gele

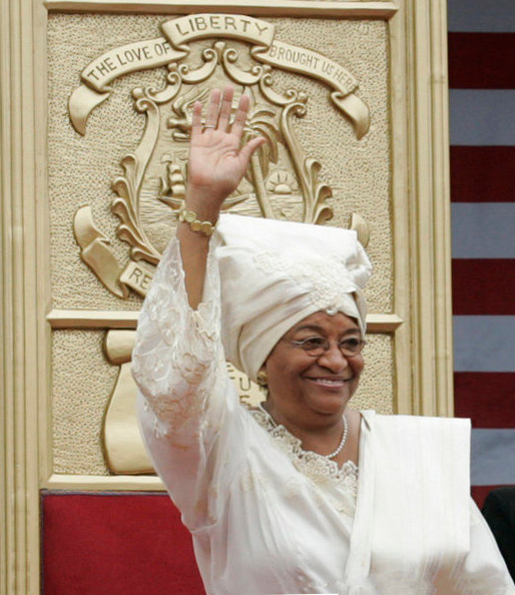
An elaborate head tie worn by Ellen Johnson Sirleaf, President of Liberia

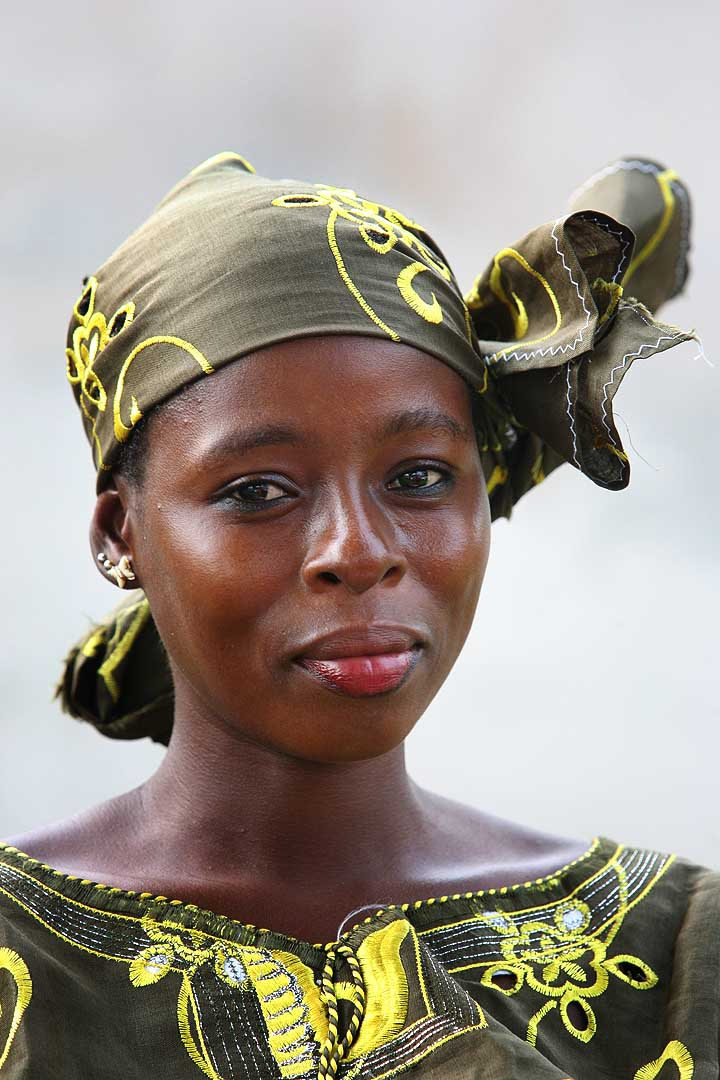
Ivoirian woman in a head-tie

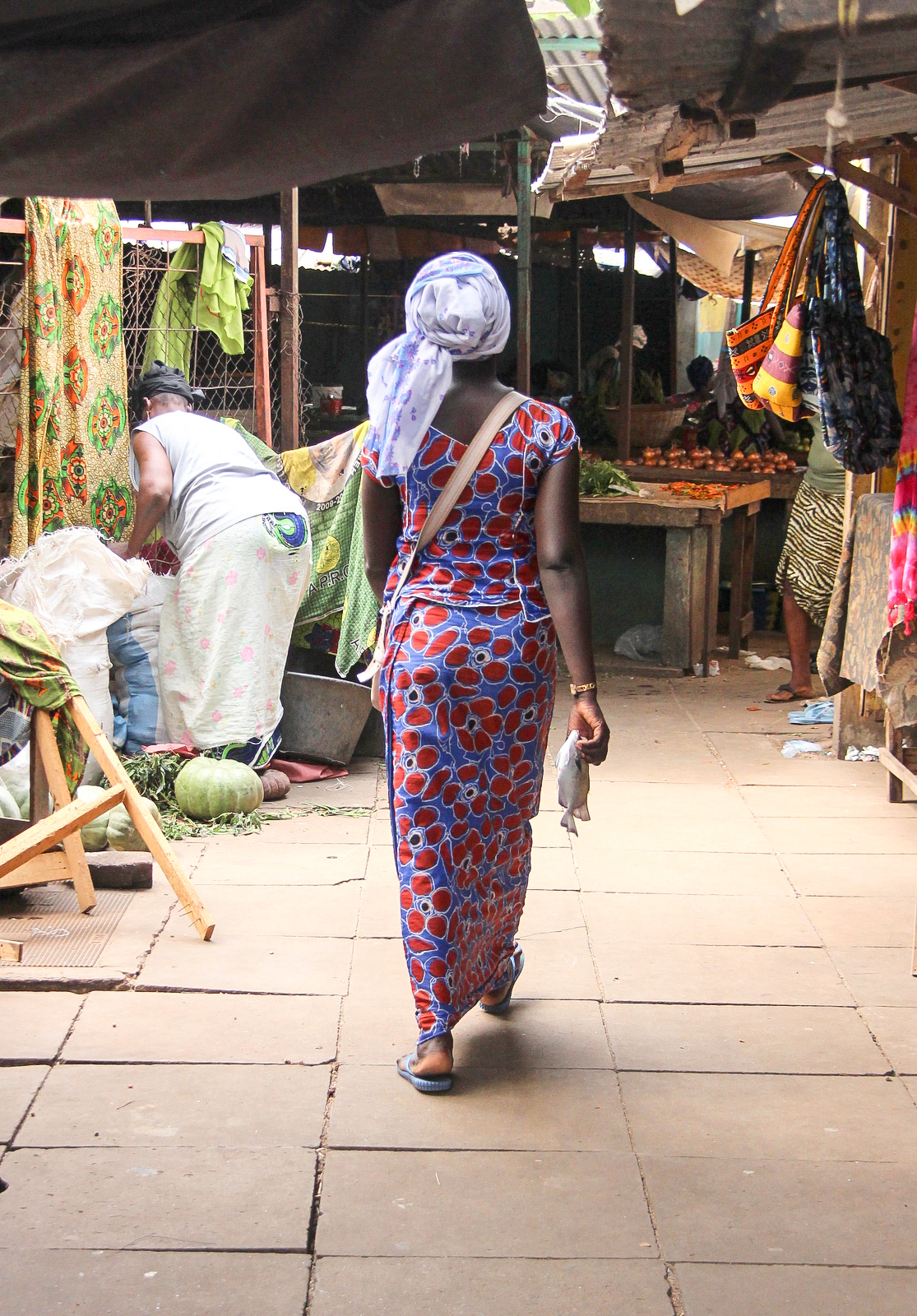
Woman with a headtie in Gambia

A head tie, also known as a headwrap, is a women's cloth head scarf that is commonly worn in many parts of West Africa and Southern Africa. The head tie is used as an ornamental head covering or fashion accessory, or for functionality in different settings. Its use or meaning can vary depending on the country and/or religion of those who wear it. Among Jewish women, the Biblical source for covering hair comes from the Torah in the book of Bamidbar Parshas Nasso which contains the source for the obligation of a married woman to cover her hair. An eesha sotah is a woman whose husband suspects her of having acted immorally. The Torah commands the Kohein to take various steps to demonstrate that the sotah has deviated from the modest and loyal path of most married Jewish women (Rashi 5:15-27). Among the procedures, the pasuk clearly states: "ufora es rosh haisha..." and he shall uncover the hair of the head of the woman (5:18). One can only uncover something that has previously been covered; in this case the Torah is referring to the married woman's hair. Among Christian women in certain parts of the world, such as Africa and the Caribbean, the head tie is worn as a headcovering in obedience to 1 Corinthians 11:4–13.

There are varying traditional names for headties in different countries, which include: Moussor (Senegal), Dankwali, Ichafu, Gele (Nigeria) Duku (Malawi, Ghana), Dhuku (Zimbabwe), Tukwi (Botswana), Doek (South Africa, Namibia) and Tignon (United States) Jewish women refer to their head ties as a tichel or mitpachat.

== West Africa ==
Among the Wolof and Mande peoples of West Africa, women’s headties express fundamental notions of propriety and are often indicators of a women’s status of marriage. According to anthropologist Mary Jo Arnoldi, these notions are thought to have been influenced by Islam which has a long history in this area.

In Nigeria, Yoruba women are renowned for tying extravagant head ties that rise several feet off their head. This practise sprang from traditional Yoruba thought systems about reverence for the Ori, which the Yoruba see as a principal deity or Orisha who resides inside the head.

The beautification of the head was seen as an extension of honor to the deity within, an honor to society at large, and a protection, based on cultural superstitions which warned that those who did not cover their head could have their secrets exposed. The culture birthed from this tradition cultivated a patient and artistic form of self expression with headties known as the Gele lit.:to be elevated.

Wearing a Gele isn't limited to any special occasions, it can be worn to the market, to visit friends, or any ongoing events. It is made from the myriad of fabrics Yorubas use for their traditional outfits, but Aso-oke is the most common. Though the Gele is an original Yoruba headtie, its influence has spread all over Nigeria. Notable observations were made by anthropologists like simon ottenberg who in 1955 documented Igbo women in the Afikpo area of Nigeria wearing the Yoruba head tie after national exposure, The Gele was also reportedly introduced to the Hausa 1940s by a Yoruba trading family in Zaria City,

Some scholars, such as Nicole Willson and Georgia Scott, say that Yoruba societies set a cultural precedent for headwrapping traditions across the African diaspora. And in places like Texas, with a large Nigerian-American population, weddings draw participation from African-Americans who seek to maintain an african identity with the use of african textiles like the Gele.

A head tie common to the Hausa in Northern Nigeria is known as the Daurin dankwali.

A comparative analysis was made in Nigeria by Nicholas Freville, he documented that, in contrast to the Gele that made Yoruba women identifiable at a distance, Igbo women and girls wore notably simpler headscarves.

In Ghana, opportunity to wear a duku usually falls on a religious day of Friday, Saturday or Sunday. This depends on whether the wearers are Muslim, Seventh-Day Adventists or Sunday church-going Christians.

In Senegal, women wear head coverings in different styles and for different occasions. The moussor (also written musoor) is a headtie or headwrap that covers part of the head and is worn decoratively. Moussors are worn for celebrations, be it religious or not.

The moussor is worn with outfits including the mbubb (called boubou in French), a loose robe, and the taille basse, which is an outfit that consist of a fitted top and a long skirt. The moussor headtie can be folded into different shapes, which includes one folded into the jalgáti (“bend the rules”) and uppukaay (“fan”), which women hold elaborately in place with pins.

In Senegal, the moussor is one form of head covering. There is the melhfa, a large draped garment linked with Mauritania and Morocco, that covers the body with the face uncovered.

Among the Igbo people of Nigeria, headties are known as the ichafu (also rendered ichafo, icafo, Ichafu-isi or akisi). Ichafu is described as a “big head tie”, worn by Igbo women at traditional ceremonies including weddings and community gatherings, as part of an attire that includes a blouse and double wrappers. Tying the ichafu can be quite laborious, sometimes requiring assistance to achieve a satisfactory style, which involves folding, twisting and pinning to achieve the desired form. Contemporary Nigerian media describes it as a bold head tie central to Igbo bridal attire. It is typically worn matching the accompanying traditional attire.

== Southern Africa ==
In South Africa and Namibia, the Afrikaans word doek (meaning "cloth") is used for the traditional head-covering used among most elderly local women in rural areas. With the spread of Protestant Christianity by Dutch settlers and their descendants (Afrikaners), along with the custom of Christian women wearing head-coverings in church, the word was adopted into other southern African languages. Malawian head-ties (duku) are usually small and conservative compared to the Nigerian style. Zimbabwean head-ties (dhuku) are similarly smaller, albeit tied a little higher. Botswanan head-ties (tukwi) are also typically wrapped shortly and often with a prominent knot.

Outside of church contexts, women wear doeks at special events like birthdays, weddings and funerals. Urban women with plaited hair also wear a doeks when visiting rural areas out of cultural respect. In addition, a woman may wear a doek during sleep to protect the hair.

In South African church services women may wear white "dukus" to cover their heads. At the International Pentecostal churches in South Africa, married women wear white 'dukus'.

The Shangaan women in Zimbabwe and South Africa wear 'dukus' as fashion accessories. At other social gatherings in Zimbabwe women may wear a dhuku.

According to Professor Hlonipha Mokoena of the Witwatersrand Institute for Social and Economic Research, historically the doek or headscarf was imposed on black women in many colonies by convention or by law as a way to control the sensuality and exoticism that "confused" white men. 2016 saw a resurgence of wearing doeks through the #FeesMustFall movement among students around South Africa.

== See also ==
- Headscarf
- Hijab
- Tignon

== Bibliography ==
- Arnoldi, Mary Jo; Kreamer, Christine Mullen, eds. (1995). Crowning Achievements: African Arts of Dressing the Head. Fowler Museum of Cultural History, University of California, Los Angeles. pp. 127, 139–145.
- Lynch, Annette; Strauss, Mitchell D., eds. (2014). Ethnic Dress in the United States: A Cultural Encyclopedia. Rowman & Littlefield. pp. 129–130.
- Stylianou, Nicola (2016). Farrelly, Liz; Weddell, Joanna (eds.). Design Objects and the Museum. London: Bloomsbury Academic. p. 42.
