= Umuogele =

Nigerian town

Umuogele is a town in Abia State, Nigeria. Umuogele is one of the communities that make up Amuda Isuochi. For administrative purposes, Ugwu na Agbo and Umuetuo units are used by the people. The area is represented by Senator Uche Chukwumerije.

There are several streams within walking distance that provide water. The government also created a well. The terrain is sloping and prone to erosion. Nearby is Iyi Okoroahor Falls, a tourist destination.
