= Akwete cloth =

Hand woven textile produced in Igboland

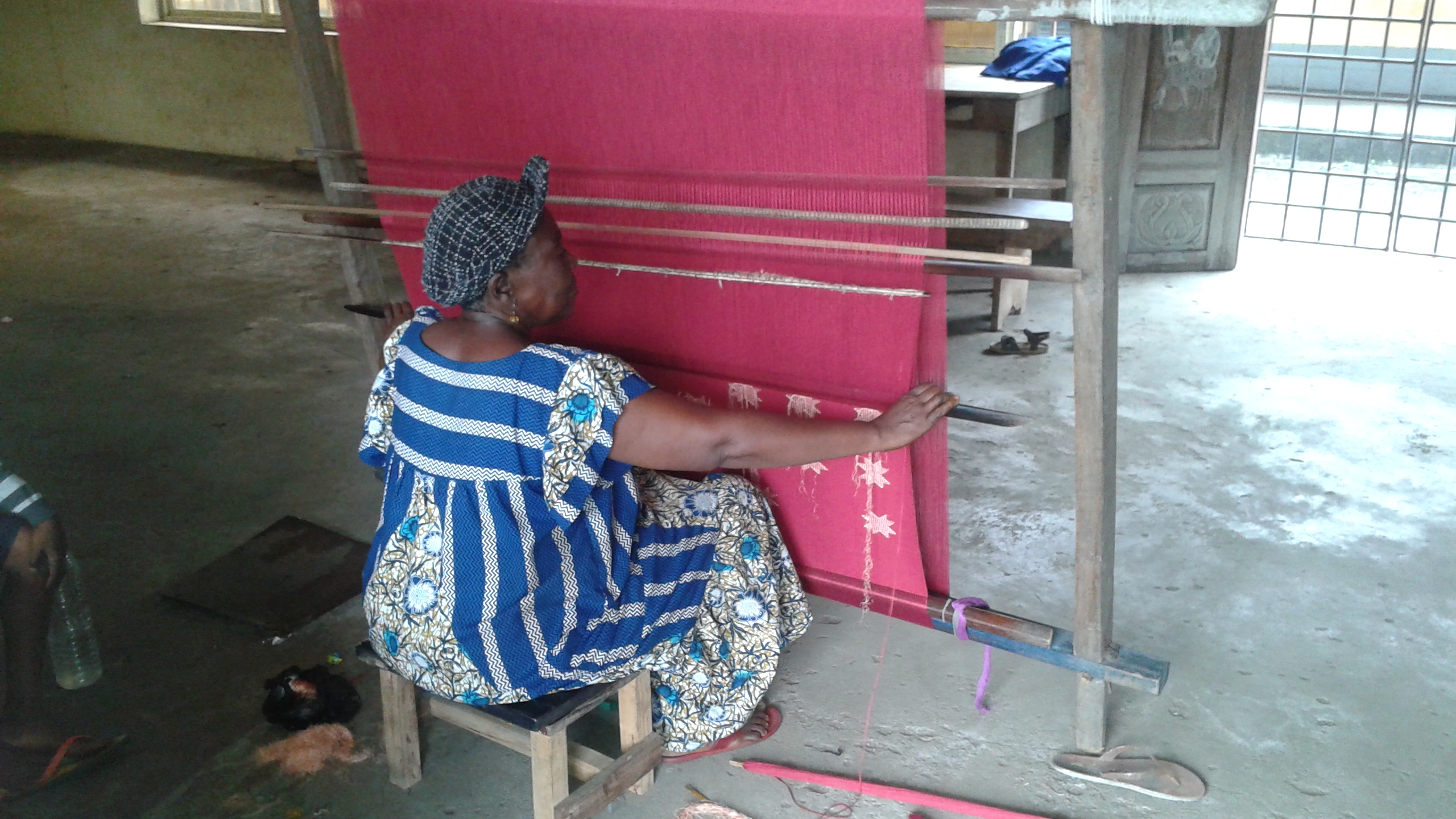
Nigerian woman handweaving akwete cloth

Akwete cloth is a hand woven textile produced in Igboland for which the town of Akwete, also known as Ndoki, both which the cloth was named after in Abia state, Nigeria is famous. Alternative names include "Mkpuru Akwete" and "Akwete fabric". This traditional Igbo weaving processes sisal, hemp, raffia, cotton or other fibres into finished products. While the coarse raffia materials are used by masquerades and in the past as headgear for warriors among other uses, the hemp material was used to weave towels, ropes and handbags. The more comfortable and colorful spun cotton is used to weave cloth for everyday wearing. Akwete cloths contain many motifs. Today, Ndoki women continue to produce Akwete cloth for a wide, global market.

== History ==
Multiple creation stories and proposed dates exist for Akwete cloth, though evidence of their existence goes back to the mid 19th century. Lamb and Holmes dated the origin to the first phase of the Portuguese contact.

Trade along the Niger Delta in communication with other groups in Igboland sparked the desire for Akwete cloth. The primary patrons of the cloth were the local Ijo (Ijaw) groups (Ibani, Okrika, Kalabari, etc.) who frequently traded for and commissioned specific patterns and colors of cloth. The connection to these groups comes from people migrating along the Niger River. Merchants from these groups had residencies within Akwete, suggesting that they would remain there for extended periods of time. Historical traditions have suggested a pre-European origin, which they traced to madam Dada Nwakata. One account records the 1850s which is the period when Dada Nwakata lived. She is also said to have received her weaving designs in dreams, worked in secrecy and introduced innovations using imported yarn and silk. Many researchers believe Akwete weaving is older than the nineteenth century and the craft must have developed over a long period to get to a stage where its production of fine cloths attracted commendation by early European visitors to the region.

Some descriptions and analysis of the motifs used on Akwete cloths have been made. The tortoise motif is a prominent design, known as Ikaki and has three categories, one has its roots in the Aso Olona fabric originating from the Ijebu. It was imported by the Ijo, renamed Ikaki meaning 'turtle', and became the official royal attire. During the 19th century, the women of Akwete took over the production of Ikaki fabric, innovating new details and designs derived from the older historical models. The other is known as blangidi or plangidi by the Niger-Delta people with English origins while another is the original Akwete type. Another explanation for the use of the tortoise known as mbe in Igbo usage as a motif was that the tortoise is the hero of many Igbo fables. Additional motifs in use on Akwete cloth are known as the Maltese cross, draughts(checkerboard), sleeping mat, fruit of the oil bean tree(ukpaka), eating utensils, animals, saw, and bow tie or wine glass.

As the palm oil and kernel trade declined along with the outlawing of slavery, Akwete cloth quickly rose to prominence as Akwete's primary trade commodity. This turned what was once a part-time occupation for women into a full-time occupation and tradition. Recognition for Akwete cloth and its complexity was further gained when Europeans began to trade with the Akwete people. Additionally, Europeans offered Akwete women training on modern weaving techniques and access to foreign waving materials. By the 1800s most Akwete weavers used only imported cotton and found ways to create patterns more quickly, such as sewing two or three stripes together. Access to European weaving methods additionally led to the Akwete utilizing the 2-yard-long European standard size for cloth. Many weavers also embraced the textures of imported silk within their work and began to replicate foreign patterns or create new designs inspired by them. The use of machine-made yarn additionally allowed Akwete weavers to improve the quality of their work and present the cloths to a vastly larger market. Another influential change to Akwete weaving was the creation and utilization of the broadloom in 1946. It was a much larger loom that reduced weaving time and allowed for larger cloths to be created. However, it was quite expensive so many Akwete women weren't able to afford it.

Traditionally, the women of the family would pass down weaving techniques to their daughters and other female members of the family. This knowledge is usually kept from those outside the community, with the exception of women marrying into an Akwete household. It was commonplace for young girls to begin learning how to weave as early as six or seven years old, and attain mastery of the craft by puberty. These girls would continue weaving and pass down these same techniques to their daughters. Women would often weave until the ages of eighty to ninety.

== Technique ==
Weaving is done on a loom. originally constructed from bamboo, and later with wood and iron. While Akwete women were responsible for weaving, it was the men's duty to construct the looms. There are two types of loom, the horizontal loom used by men and the vertical loom used by women. Traditionally most of the weaving is done on Nkwe looms, the largest looms in Nigeria, by women. However, outside of the city, men began to learn the weaving techniques and produce cloth as well. Most Akwete cloth is 40-50 inches wide when completed. The thread is fastened with Egbu-Nkwe, and the Ukwu-Nkpuro utilizes stretching to lessen the chance of bending while weaving. An additional device called an Ekiki is used to adjust the width of the fabric, making separate threats with a Paapaa. Once the thread has been woven, an Ahia Heddle is used to create designs on the fabric. A continuous warp thread gives a solid color background for the motifs. A two-color warp background is also used which produces a blended color effect. An iridescent color effect can also be produced when the warp is one color and the base weft (as opposed to decorative motive weft) another. Fabrics are woven to be single faced or double faced, that is the motifs show on both sides. Too much pressure while weaving can cause a design to appear lopsided when completed. Weaving techniques and symbolism additionally includes mixing colors for a wide variety of effects. The swivel inlay technique is also commonly used.

Originally, weaving materials were cultivated locally within Akwete itself. Base fabric is mostly low-twist yarn cotton, with the decorative motifs consisting of coarser or heavier spun cotton, low twist silk, or shiny rayon. Cotton and rayon combinations give a multicolored, brocaded look. The most traditionally used materials for weaving were raffia, sisal-hemp, and spun cotton. It is standard practice today for Akwete women to use only imported threads. It can take an individual weaver up to three days to finish weaving a cloth depending on size and complexity of technique and pattern.

In addition to production, the distribution of Akwete cloth was also handled by the women of Akwete. The women of Akwete set up a weaving society that later transitioned into a collective of female weavers focused on fabric quality as well as issues of copyright. In this group, women have the freedom to create whatever they want and maintain ownership of concepts.

Akwete weaving differ from other kinds of weaving by being usually the width of a woman's wrapper, and most categories of the cloth are woven in pairs of identical design. Although they're woven and sold in pairs, they're not sewn together but worn together. One is a wrapper, and the other may be worn as a stole, made into a matching blouse or folded and wrapped over the top of the bottom wrapper.

== Use ==
Akwete fabric is used by both people in Nigeria and exported to other countries. The Akwamiri style of Akwete cloth was used by other people groups as waist ties for men, but also as towels, coverings for chairs, and as material for bags.

Among the Akwete people, the cloth is used to signify wealth or power, and it is primarily worn by women as wraps or loincloths, though men do wear them occasionally, both for everyday use and for ceremonial purposes. For example, Akwete cloth can be used as a wedding dowry, as well as decorations for royal burial sites. Everyday uses range from dresses, covers, wraps, wall decorations, and bedspreads.

Traditionally, raffia woven cloths would be used specifically for masquerade purposes, warrior garb, and ceremonial dress. Cotton spun cloths were used for casual wear as everyday clothing. However, in modern times both designs may be used in casual wear.

== Motifs ==
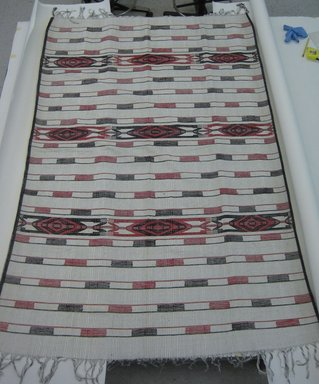
Akwete Cloth featuring Ikaki motif and rectangular bands displayed in the Brooklyn Museum, made out of commercial cotton, 63 x 82in

The weavers in Akwete claim to know over a hundred different motifs but not more than three or four are usually used simultaneously on one piece of cloth. Traditionally the creator of a new motif is granted an unwritten copyright. This is explained by the inspirational aspect of the development of motifs in the society, certain motifs being regarded as gifts of creative inspiration from a divinity. Essentially, the gods grant the weaver a pre-established copyright to the pattern produced. Motifs and themes are additionally commonly derived from dreams.

In terms of trade with other cultures, a commonly traded cloth was "Akwa Miri" (Cloth of the water) translating to "towel". It was woven as either a white cloth or a white cloth with indigo stripes.

The motifs used in Akwete cloth consist of the tortoise motif known as ikaki, nnadede, and Ikperendioma. Other patterns are the jioji (George) and popo.

"Tortoise" or "Ikaki" is the most commonly produced motif and pattern. There are three major patterns of ikaki. The first is the original Akwete type, another is based on Ijebu Yoruba prestige cloth, Aso-olona. The third type had a solid-colored background covered with recurring image of a flower, bag, bird, or clusters of animals. This is called Blangidi or Plangidi by the Niger-Delta. The word is derived from the English word blanket from where it traces its origin. Some accounts of the use of the tortoise as a motif in Akwete was that the tortoise is the hero of many Igbo fables. Traditionally, it was created solely for royalty; anyone who wore Ikaki that was not royal would be sold into slavery. This motif used the image of the tortoise, viewed as a wise and cunning creature symbolic of chieftaincy. It was also used for coronation and royal burials. It additionally represented peace .

Social status plays a role in the wearing of Akwete cloth, certain motifs being reserved for royalty, such as Ikaki, or used as a talisman to protect warriors going into battle or women in pregnancy, such as the "Ebe" motif. Some patterns are reserved for special families or occasions because of circumstances pertaining to motif origin.

Another example of this tradition is Nnadede cloth. The oral legend describes the triumphant return of a famous warrior in the 1860s, whose father presented him with the cloth upon returning to Akwete. The pattern was only used only for status and royal ceremonies, but gradually became a commonly used design in Akwete weaving. Upon the arrival of Christianity to Akwete, weavers crafted the "Ikperendioma" pattern, meaning "the good people's knees". This motif displayed kneeling Christians worshiping in a church-like setting. Other motifs include traditional beliefs, legends, common tools, household items, and plants.

Popo and Jioji cloth are another design. Popo was named after the town of Opobo where it was originally sold while Jioji was inspired by the Indian madras.

In recent times, Akwete weaving patterns have begun to display themes relevant to Nigeria as a whole, utilizing the design and colors of the Nigerian flag, the coat of arms and celebrating the Black Festival of the Arts in Nigeria.

== In modern culture ==
In modern times Akwete weaving has become an activity and art that men and women, Akwete and foreigners alike participate in. Other local groups that have become practitioners of Akwete weaving are the Rivers, Enugu, Ebonyi, and Benue states. In contrast to traditional Akwete standards, more men from the Benue state weave Akwete cloths than women. Additionally, the widespread use of mangrove and raffia materials makes it easier to share weaving techniques and has helped the art form flourish in Abia State. Akwete is one of the few communities in which weaving is prospering, as the number of female weavers in other areas of Nigeria has declined in recent years.

Several communities local to Nigeria have intentionally begun practicing and promoting Akwete weaving to keep the art and techniques relevant in the modern industry. The Ekwueme Federal University Ndufu located in southeastern Nigeria established a center focused on Akwete weaving and encouraging the cultural pride of the Akwete people, as well as teaching an Akwete weaving course, which covers a year's worth of training. The university encourages students to wear Akwete cloth on "Traditional Dress Mondays" and gives the cloths produced to important visitors as gifts. The university's approach favors a more formal education, allowing students to pursue the trade while also being in school, and independent of the tradition of passing techniques down through generations. This allows the craft to be explored by more people. Apprenticeships for weaving are also becoming a model of education that is rising in popularity.

== See also ==
- Akwa ocha
- Ukara cloth
- Jioji cloth
- Igbo regalia and headdresses

== Notes ==
- Akwete Cloth and Its Motifs, Marian Davis, African Arts Vol. 7, No. 3 (Spring, 1974), pp. 22–25 Published by: UCLA James S. Coleman African Studies Center
- Akwete cloth: An Igbo textile art Vanguard Newspaper published July 26, 2012 by McPhilips Nwachukwu and Appollos Oziogu Ibebabuchi
