= Azumini =

Town in Abia State, Nigeria

- Town
- Location in Nigeria
- Coordinates: 4°56′29″N 7°29′34″E
- Country: Nigeria
- State: Abia

Azumini is a town in Nigeria's Abia state. It is located some 15 miles south of the commercial city of Aba, on the border with Akwa-Ibom State. It is famous for the Azumini Blue River.

It is also an ancient slave trade route through the blue river commonly known in local dialect as Mini- Okigo.
