= Aba River (Nigeria) =

River of Nigeria

Aba River River Aba
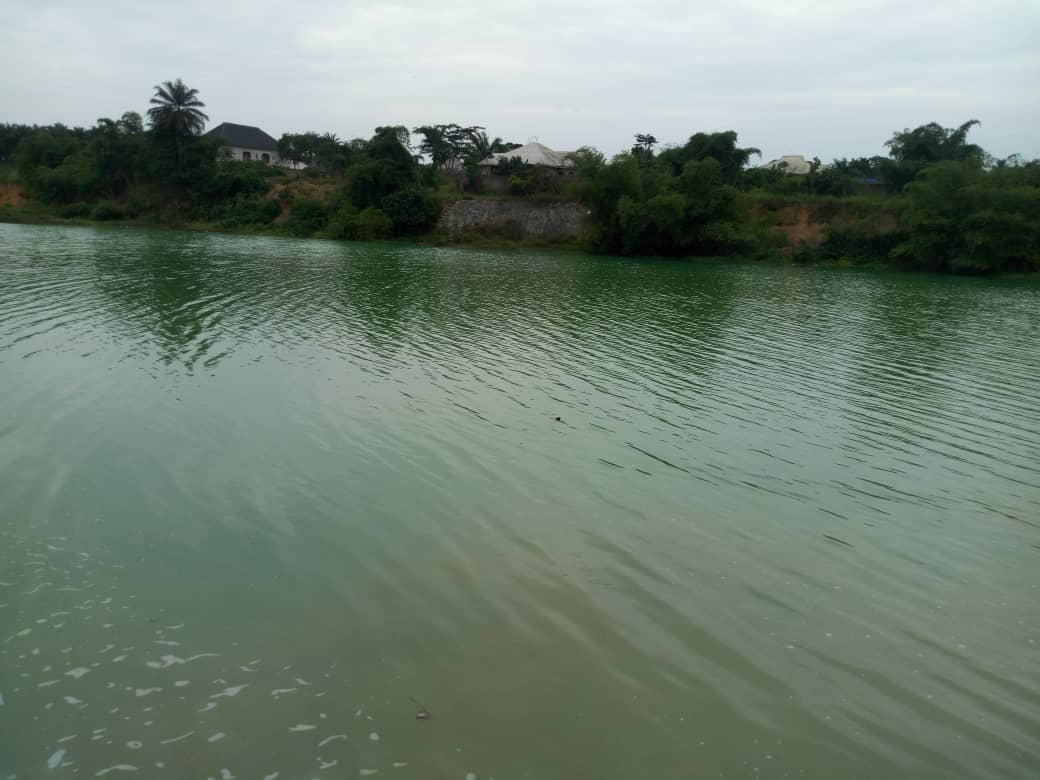

- Mouth

Location
- Country: Nigeria

Physical characteristics
- Mouth
  - coordinates: 4°49′22″N 7°29′27″E

Basin features
- River system: Imo River

The Aba River is a river in southern Nigeria. A tributary of Imo river that runs through the city of Aba, Nigeria. Its headwater is in Okpu-Umuobo area (Okpu-Umuobo, Isiala-Okpu and Mgboko-Umuette autonomous communities) Osisioma Ngwa LGA in the Ngwa heartland. This Aba River is also known as Waterside.

The river is largely ignored despite its uniqueness and importance. Activities of local sand dredges who source sharp sand for construction purposes has been keeping the river flowing.

== Pollution ==
The Aba River have over the years faced different level of pollution from Multinationals, Cattle farmers, and residents in neighboring communities. Residents, many of whom had previously used the river's resources, asserted that the river was teeming with aquatic life and provided drinking water and other domestic uses for the people of the communities along its banks before the emergence of various businesses that no longer discharge their wastes into the water body in the 1970s.

Even worse, the river's pollution was increased by the "Ahiaudele" (market of vultures) abattoir and cattle market, which is situated along the river's banks. The river's resources are getting scarcer.

Two localities that are home to the Nigerian Breweries PLC, Aba Plant, filed a lawsuit against the business in the Abia State High Court over what they claim is an ongoing environmental abuse matter. The locals claimed that Nigerian Breweries had continued to release waste, hazardous chemicals, and effluent water into the Aba River, popularly known as "Iyi Aza Ogbor" or "Waterside".

== Course and environmental issues ==
The Aba River flows through Abia State in southeastern Nigeria and forms part of the Imo River drainage system before ultimately discharging into the Atlantic Ocean. The river has historically supported domestic water supply, agriculture, fishing, and industrial activities within Aba and surrounding communities.

Rapid urbanisation and industrial development around Aba have resulted in increasing pressures on the river. Studies have reported elevated concentrations of nutrients, heavy metals, suspended solids, and microbial contaminants in some reaches receiving untreated municipal and industrial effluents.

Various environmental agencies and academic institutions have recommended improved wastewater treatment, pollution monitoring, and watershed management to restore water quality and protect aquatic ecosystems.
