= Akwete =

Akwete Akwete Ndoki
- Town
- Nickname: Ndoki village
- Location in Nigeria
- Coordinates (NG): 4°53′14″N 7°21′26″E
- Country: Nigeria
- State: Abia State
- LGA: Ukwa East

Government
  - Type: Traditional

Population
  - Ethnicity: Igbo
  - Religion: Christianity; Omenala
- Time zone: UTC+1 (WAT)
- National language: Igbo

Akwete town is the headquarters of Ukwa East local government area of Abia state, Nigeria. Akwete is located 18 kilometres (11 miles) northeast of the oil-rich city of Port Harcourt and 18 kilometres (11 miles) southeast of the commercial city of Aba. Akwete is an important community of the Ndoki and Igbo people in general, they belong to the Umuihueze II clan. Akwete is known in West Africa for its unique weaving.

Akwete shares boundaries with Umuagbai community of Oyigbo Local Government Area of Rivers State

In the early 19th-century Akwete was one of the main destinations of Aro slave traders and they brought Igbo and other people they had enslaved or purchased from other enslavers to the coast. One of the people who was brought to Akwete by this trade was Jaja of Opobo who later became the king of the city-state of Opobo. Akwete was also involved in the palm oil trade, and when Jaja was brought there while enslaved in about 1830 the palm oil trade had become the main export trade of Akwete.

== Etymology ==
The origin of the name Akwete has over the years been a subject of controversy. There is a version that asserts that the name Akwete emanated or originated from 'Aku-Ete'. This version is of the opinion that the name Akwete was derived from the rope palm tree cutters use in climbing the trees known as Ete. Another popular opinion is that the word emanates from the Ndoki Weaving Technology which Akwete women are famous for.

== Climate ==
The climate in Akwete is uncomfortable year-round and warm and foggy during the wet and dry seasons. The average annual temperature ranges from 19 to 32 degrees Celsius (67 to 90 degrees Fahrenheit), rarely falling below 16 °C (60 °F) or rising above 34 °C (93 °F).

It is not fully meaningful to talk about hot and cold seasons in Akwete because the temperature there varies so little from season to season.

=== Clouds ===
Over the course of the year, there is a considerable seasonal change in Akwete's average cloud cover 100%.

Around November 24 marks the start of Akwete's clearer season, which lasts for 2.6 months and ends around February 13.

In Akwete, December is the clearest month of the year, with the sky remaining clear, mostly clear, or partly cloudy 38% of the time.

Beginning about February 13 and lasting for 9.4 months, the cloudier period of the year ends around November 24.

April is the cloudiest month of the year in Akwete, with the sky being overcast or mostly cloudy 88% of the time on average during that month.

=== Precipitation ===
A day that has at least 0.04 inches of liquid or liquid-equivalent precipitation is considered to be wet. In Akwete, the likelihood of rainy days varies wildly throughout the year.

The 7.7-month wetter season, which runs from March 20 to November 12, has a probability of precipitation of more than 47% on any one day. In Akwete, September has an average of 25.6 days with at least 1.0 millimetre (0.04 inches) of precipitation, making it the month with the most rainy days.

Between November 12 until March 20, or 4.3 months, is the dry season. With an average of 2.7 days with at least 1.0 millimetre (0.04 inches) of precipitation, January is the month in Akwete with the fewest number of rainy days.

We categorize wet days into those that include snow, rain, or a combination of the three. In Akwete, September has an average of 25.6 days of rain, which is the most of any month. This classification shows that rain alone is the most frequent type of precipitation throughout the year, with a high likelihood of 87% on September 12.
