= Yoruba clothing =

Yoruba traditional clothing

Yoruba clothing is the traditional clothing, including the textiles, fashion, hairstyles, jewelry, body ornamentation and other bodily adornments worn and used by people of the Yoruba ethnic group in parts of Nigeria, Benin and Togo in a region called Yorubaland.

Yoruba clothing is not only a form of dressing but also an expression of identity, reflecting the complex history, traditions, values, beliefs and culture of the Yoruba people. The choice and style of clothing reflects the personality, mood, taste, and creativity of the wearer within the Yoruba cultural framework. It also conveys messages about the social status, marital status, age group, and cultural affiliation of the wearer. They can be functional, casual or ceremonial depending on the reasons why they are being worn.

== Early history ==
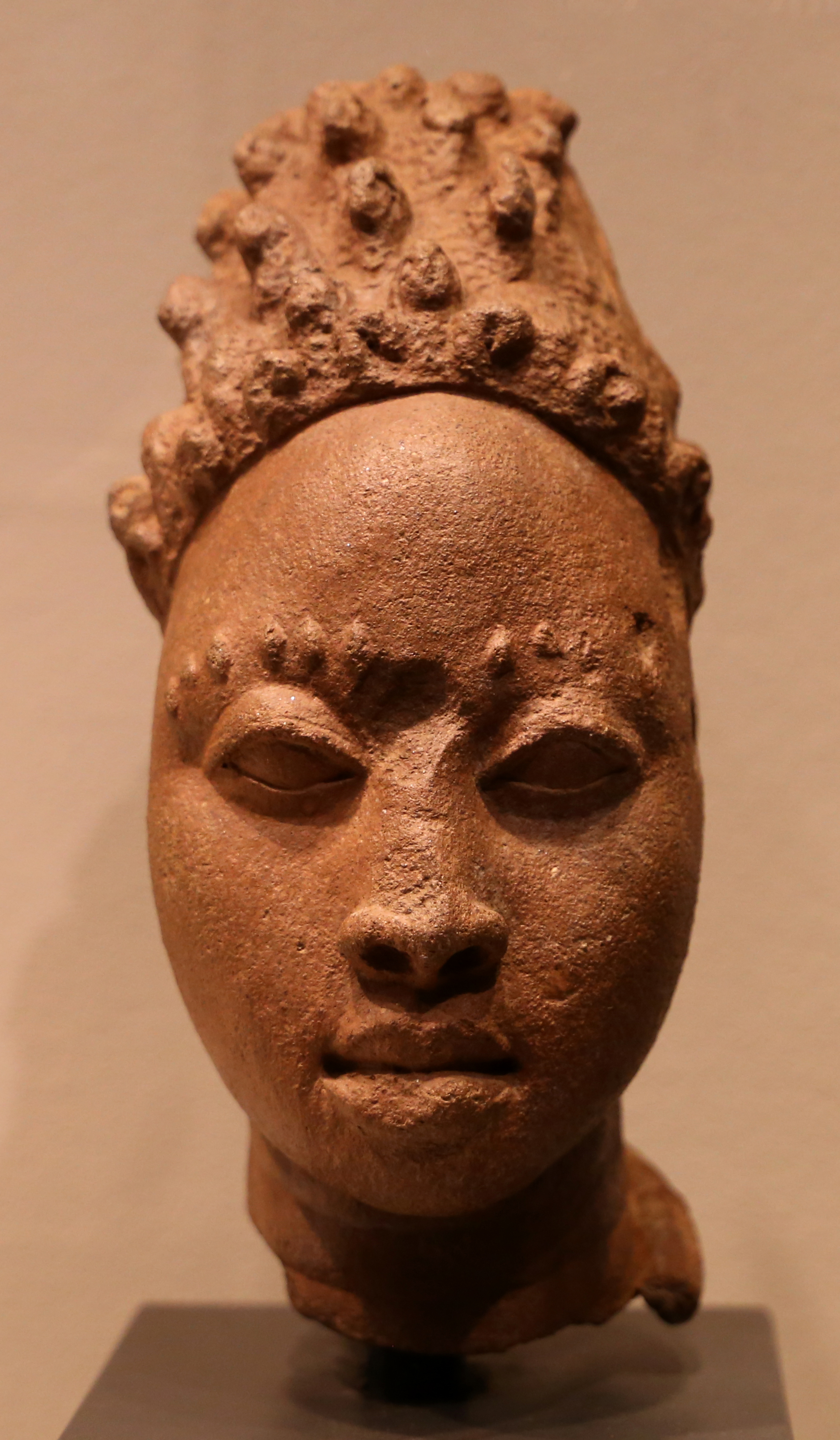
memorial head of an Ife dignitary, 12th century, in elaborate headgear

Clothing among the Yoruba is of great antiquity. The earliest records are unknown, partly because much of early history was transmitted orally. Some scholars suggest that Yoruba weaving traditions may have prehistoric origins. As early as the 700s AD, locally produced multicoloured glass from Orun Oba Ado and Igbo Olokun, as well as imported foreign glass were utilized in Ife to make beads. Around 800 AD, the Idena 'gatekeeper' and Oreluere a.k.a.Olofefura granite figures at the Ore grove associated with Oke Ora was sculpted in Ile-Ife depicting a man in a large wrapper girded by a tasseled sash hanging to the side around his lower body, as well as bracelets and globular beads strung into a circular neck adornment. It sheds some insight into the clothing customs of Yorubaland at the time.

Academic studies have examined terracotta and brass sculptures from Ife dating to the 10th century CE, depicting figures wearing wrappers, robes, head gears, beaded necklaces, armlets, anklets, badges, elaborate hairdo, and other garments and accessories resembling traditional Yoruba attires. These representations suggest that Yoruba clothing traditions have a history spanning more than a millennium. In Yoruba tradition, Obalufon is regarded as the patron Orisha of textiles.

In the 12th century, in a period predating or of the same time as cotton finds in the Sahara-Sahel region, cotton was being grown and processed locally into cloth within Ife. This was confirmed by the analysis of cotton seed and coat fragments retrieved in archaeo-botanical contexts from the medieval urban center of Ife.

By 1519, cloth produced by the Ijebu had become a recognised trade commodity in regional and international commercial networks. A Portuguese document from that year records the circulation of Ijebu ('Jabu' or 'Jaboo') cloth in areas such as São Tomé and the Gold Coast (present-day southern Ghana). Ijebu textiles were also traded within the Niger-delta in Nigeria, forming part of a wider regional product and commodity trade. In 1688, Frenchman, Du Casse, noted that the Europeans in the kingdoms of Allada and Whydah bought woven cloth coming from the "Kingdom of Concomi" for resale at the Gold coast. Subsequent accounts of this extensive cloth trade identify the source as 'Lucamee' or 'Locomin', variants of Olukumi a Yoruba ethnonym. The kingdoms producing these clothes was likely Ijebu, Oyo or both. Such Yoruba clothes were among the material wealth left behind by the Governor Richard Brew of Anomabu on the Gold Coast in 1776. In the early 1800's, Hugh Clapperton reported seeing several weaving looms engaging in regular manufacturing at Ijanna among the Yewa. He then visited several cloth-making factories and dyeing stations afterwards.

== Women's clothing ==
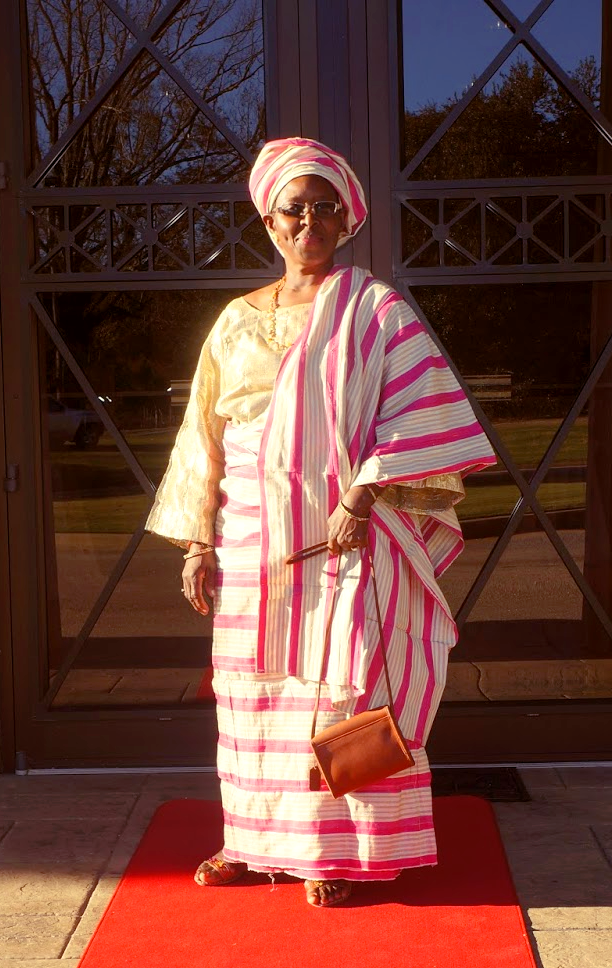
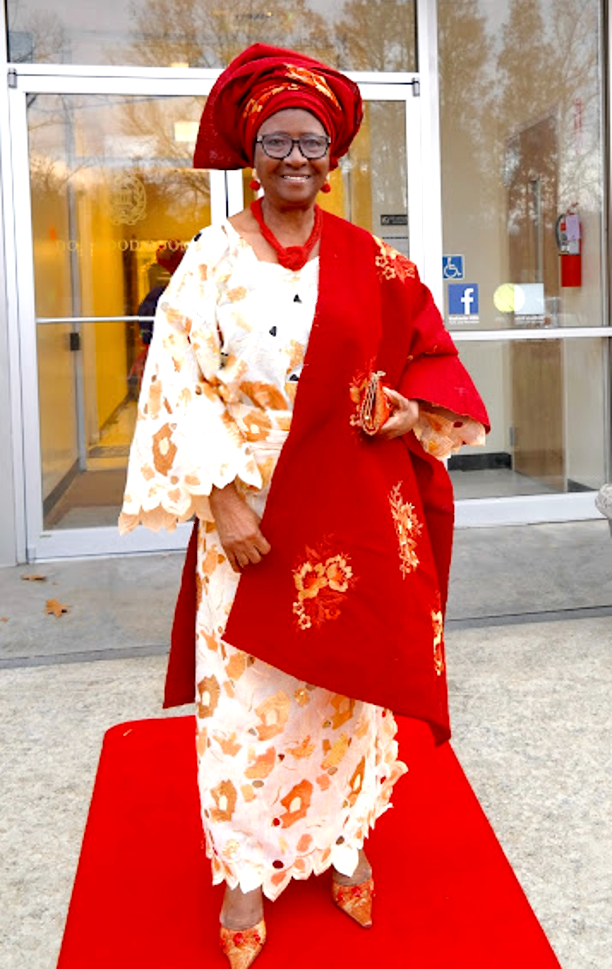
Yoruba women in traditional long Ìró and Bùbá (left and right). Oleku variant (middle).

=== Styles and clothes ===
The main components of Yoruba women's clothing include, but are not limited to:

- Iro ati Buba: This consists of a loose or tight fitting blouse or top gown that covers the upper body (bùbá), and a large wrapper (ìróbìnrin) that is wrapped and tied around the body at the chest or waist, and covers anywhere from the chest/mid torso downwards to the lower body. The Iro and Buba can be made of the same mterial, or different materials that complement colours and texture. Bubas come in a range of design variations, with diverse neckline, sleeve, embroidery and embellishment options depending on the occasion and the wearer's taste, while Iros can have varying lengths, widths, and patterns. The combination is made from various fabrics, such as Aso-oke/Aso-ofi, Adire, Aran (velvet), Seghosen, Aso olona, Seda (silk), Lace, or Olowoyo (damask/brocade). Iro ati Buba is most times paired with Gele, Iborun and/or Ipele. The Iro can also be worn without Buba as an outfit on its own with other components of Yoruba attire.
  - Oleku: This is a short knee length Iro ati Buba style or dress. It is not as long as typical Iro ati Buba attire.
- Gele: An elaborate Yoruba cultural head-tie that is wrapped around the head in various styles. It can be made from stiff or soft fabrics, such as aso-oke, damask, adire or ankara. Geles come in different colours, shapes, sizes and decorations, depending on the occasion and it can be as expressive as the wearer wants it to be.
- Komole: This is a long gown fashioned after the Iro ati Buba. The Komole dress can have different necklines, sleeves, embroidery and embellishments, depending on the occasion and the wearer's taste. It is popular as a wedding wear among Yoruba brides.
A Yoruba bride with bridesmaids. The bride is wearing the Komole outfit.
- Kaja: Also called Pakaja, this is a Toga-like unisex Yoruba outfit. It is passed around the armpit and knotted on the shoulder. Yoruba women wear it to events. It is more common among Yoruba dignitaries and royals. A variation of the outfit for women is to make it first, then tying an ìró (wrapper) over it at the waist, or tying the iro from the chest down to the feet first, and then making a thigh, waist, or knee length kaja over it.
- Yeri: Native skirts of the Yoruba, worn by both sexes.
- Kaba: These are Yoruba styles of short-sleeved dresses or gowns, extending down over the legs. They are made from fabrics such as Ankara, Adire or Lace, and can be made as a single piece which pinches/gathers at the chest or waist and flows down as pleats or flares over the hips, or as a blouse with wrappers and skirts. The silhouette / outlook of Kaba blouses bear strong European influences such as Yokes, puff sleeves, frills, etc and may have been introduced by the Yoruba Saro in Sierra Leone through Abeokuta and Lagos.

=== Women's accessories ===
Some other accessories Yoruba women use include:

- Bata — Women's shoes and footwear.
- Ikoti — Decorative or ornamental Hair pins.
- Irukere — Commonly called "horse tail" or "fly-whisk", also called Irukẹ.
- Ileke — Beads of different types, colours and shapes.
- Lagidigba — Waist or hip jewellery, called 'Bebe' when used in large numbers.
- Yeti — Earrings.
- Abebe — Handfans of varied shapes.
- Egba owo — Bracelets / Armlets and Bangles.
- Egba orun — Necklaces of varying lenghths.
- Oyiya (Ooya) — Decorative or ornamental hair combs.
- Ago — Women's wrist watches (agogo / aago ọwọ).

A former Alake of Abeokuta in a courtyard, flanked by people holding large decorated circular Abebe handfans

- Iborun — This is a long Stole or Shawl that is used on the shoulder. It may be netted or transparent, and thrown over the bride's Gele like a veil at weddings, before a face-reveal.
- Ipele — A traditional second wrapper tied around the waist over the first by adults. It was not worn by pre-pubescent girls, and was sometimes removed and draped across the shoulder like the iborun. Its use as a second wrapper reduced drastically in the 1960's, as It became increasingly held on the shoulder or forearm. It can be made from the same fabric as the gele or a different one. Ipeles come in different sizes, fringes, and embroidery fitted to the wearer's taste.
- Other accessories include clutch purses.

=== Hairstyles ===
Yoruba Women's hairstyles are an important aspect of Yoruba clothing. These hairstyles include braiding and weaving (biba), plaiting (didi), threading (kiko) and inverted cornrows (didi oloba) styles done since ancient times. These are used to beautify Yoruba women's hair when the Gele is not in use. Yoruba women's hairstyles are used in daily life, festivals and by performers.

Some traditional Yoruba braided hairstyles include: Suku/Shuku, Kolese, Koroba, Patewo / Moremi, Adimole (cornrows), etc. Threaded hairstyles (Irun Owu) called 'Irun kiko' involve knotting or wrapping tufts, locks or strands of hair in thread. Examples include; Kojusoko, Panumo, Ipako elede, Akuko Gagara, Layipo, Ogun Pari, Patewo, Onile gogoro etc. Hair can also be made or left as dreads called Dada. Beads are frequently added to finished hairstyles to beautify them as well.

=== Body ornamentation ===
Bodily ornamentation among Yoruba women include the following:

Henna: Called Laali in Yoruba, some Yoruba women use henna as a type of body decoration. The henna can be done on the hands, colour the fingernails red, and/or on the feet.

Kohl or Eyeliner: Called Tìróò or Tiro in Yoruba.

Tattoos: Traditional Yoruba tattoos and body art using bunched up needles are called 'Sọjú', while scarifications using razors and blades to make several small cuts is called 'Ara Finfin'. The needles and razors used in making the designs are specially fabricated for that purpose, and it was popular among spinsters and bachelors contemplating marriage.

== Men's clothing ==
=== Styles and clothes ===
Ewu: These are sleeved shirts or tunics worn over trousers by Yoruba men. They can be plain or embroidered with thread-work. Styles include:

- Bùbá — Embroidered or plain shirt worn by itself or as the first and inner piece for/of the Agbada.
- Kukumo (or Togo) — Plain, sleeveless and collarless vest or gown worn plainly or as a foundation for the Kaja.
- Esiki — This is a tunic with short sleeves originally used either as a casual housewear, workwear or undergarment.

All of these can be worn as an undergarment base over which bulkier clothes are worn. In this function, they are called Awotele lit. 'under wear'. The garments worn over them, such as the different types of Agbada and Pakaja are clled Awoleke lit. 'over wear'.

Agbada: A heavily embroidered three or four-piece robe worn by Yoruba men. It is worn both as a ceremonial outfit and for casual outings. There are different types of Agbada, including:

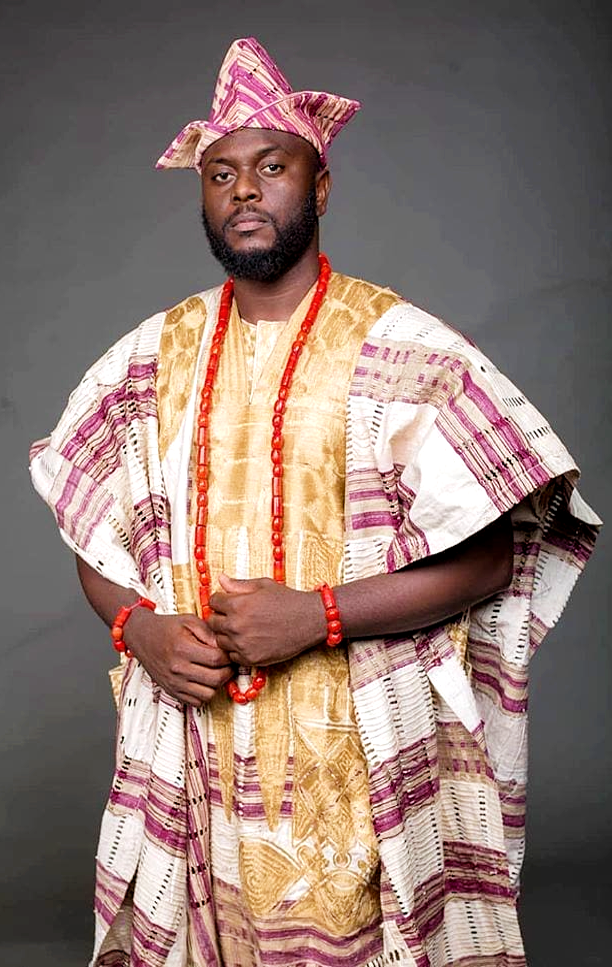
A Yoruba man in Agbada and Fila Abeti-Aja hat

Man in Agbada with Abebe, Opa, Gobi, Iborun

- Gbariye — A type of clothing characterised by expandable triangular wedge pleats at the waist. It is shorter, snug/tighter around the torso and wider/flares out towards the hips and knees, essentially fluted smocks.
- Sapara — A lighter, shorter and less voluminous type made to be more comfortable, with a very large (wide and long) pocket in the center of the chest area.
- Suliya (Shulia) — The smallest and plainest gown with two well embroidered vertical slit front pocket openings.
- Others include; Oyala, and Girike or Ginki (the largest and heaviest).

Pakaja / Kaja: This is a Toga-like clothing worn by Yoruba men, enhancing the stature of the wearer. The Yoruba dictionary of 1852 describes it as passing a 'country cloth' from under the arm to the shoulder. The Kaja can be done with one or two wrappers, and can be knotted on one or both shoulders. There are two main styles/types:

- Guru — This is when the toga leaves a trail/train that can be left fallen or held in the arm when moving around.
- Gogowu — This is the style, as well as the large wrapper draped around the body, on the inner Buba or Kukumo (Togo) vest when going out, but which doesn't touch the ground.

A man in Pakaja of Sanyan and Onide cap

A Yoruba man in Pakaja of and Gobi hat

A man in Pakaja, Iborun, Esiki and Fila Gobi

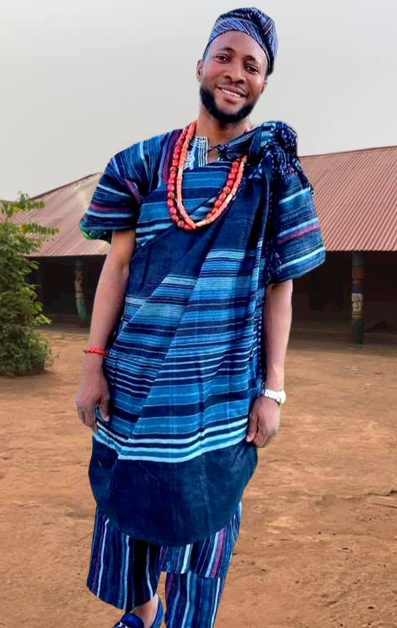
A man in Pakaja (Gogowu) of Etu & Kembe

In his 1829 account of Oyo-Ile, Clapperton describes the Kaja or Ibora-oke dressing style as he saw it, and actually calls it the court etiquette.

It is the court etiquette here to appear in a loose cloth, tied under one arm; part over the other shoulder, and hanging down to the feet in a graceful manner.

Fila: These are the traditional caps worn by the men. Yoruba ceremonial male dressing is usually considered 'incomplete' without a hat (cap) or head-gear. There are two major classes. These are: the cylindrically shaped caps called Ikori, and the 'dog-eared' varieties called 'Labankada'. They come in varied shapes, and include;

The two Fila onide Yoruba cap types on mannequin models

- Gobi or Origi — A cylindrical cap made of flexible material, featuring a dropped side that can be styled in multiple directions. It may be heavily embroidered stiff on the round head opening. It is the most common fila today.
- Adiro — A cap with a considerably longer bulbous slouch that reaches to around the shoulder. It is also called 'Fila olode', and well used by hunters in the past. It is the longest in the Ikori family.
- Fila onide — A velvet cap whose name translates as 'cap of brass' (idẹ). It is of two types; flat top and foldable / droopy top. It features large and intricately braided golden/yellow/brass and/or silver thread-work on the top and around (hence its name), and sometimes, a hanging tassel (winjin winjin). It is sometimes called 'Fila Asinde' or 'Fila Ide'.
- Abeti Aja — A cap styled with two "handles" that resemble dog ears, which may be droopy or upright. It is made from different fabrics including Aso oke and Damask.. They are also knon generally as Labankada, or Yoti.
- Akete — A wide brimmed hat similar to a Sombrero, popular in places like Ondo, Ife, Egba and Lagos. It is also called Ege.
- Other caps include; Bentigo and Alabo (the type Awolowo is popular for).

Shokoto: Sokoto are Yoruba men's native trousers. They are traditionally kept around the waist by a drawstring or cord and are of different types, including:

- Sokoto penpe — Shorts
- Sooro (Shoro) — Long slim trousers.
- Kenbe (Kembe) — A loose, baggy, three-quarter length trouser.
- Kafo or Sanyinmotan — A kind of trouser that is tight around the legs and stretches past the knees.
- Ladugbo or Aibopo — This is a kind of shorts that is tight at the knees where it terminates.
- Agadansi — This is large, baggy and swivelly from the waist but tight at the lower legs and ankles. When worn, the extra fabric gathers into a large volume between the legs. It is also called Nangudu.
- Kébẹ́ — Knee length breeches.
- Other trousers, including: Kamu, Abadan, and Efa / Atu / Abenugbangba, which is very wide at the base near the feet.

Iro: This is a traditional wrapper tied around the waist by Yoruba men as 'Iro Okunrin'.

Son of the Oluwa of Lagos c. 1920, in Buba, Agbada and Iro wrapper

Yeri: Native skirts of Yoruba men. The 'Yeri Apagun' is a derivative that looks like a bounded wrapper.

=== Men's accessories ===
Accessories used by Yoruba men include, but are not limited to;

Opa: A cane, staff or rod accessory used by Yoruba men, which can be ceremonial or functional. They are of different types:

- Opa Ase/Opa Ileke — These are scepters of authority. They can be made of metal, wood, and are usually beaded. It is usually used by kings and other high ranking chiefs and titled men.
- Opa Itele — This is a hand held walking stick used generally by men in the society, and can be used as a fashion accessory.

Abebe: Traditional handfans which come in varied shapes and sizes.

Ileke: A myriad of traditional beads of different types, which can be worn on different body parts:

- Ileke Orun — Neck beads
- Ileke Owo — Hand beads
- Ileke Ese — Leg or ankle beads

Ibora: These are Capes made of a large cloth thrown over the shoulders around the nape of the neck by fashionable men after fully dressing, as a luxury layer or item cementing a dignified look.

Irukere: Fly whisks a.k.a. horse tails, cow tails. They are also called Iruke.

Bata: Shoes, boots, leather slippers, and other footwear, including Salubata (sandals).

Oruka: Rings worn on the fingers.

Egba: Bracelets, necklaces and armlets.

Laba: A traditional leather satchel. As a functional item, small things can be put inside, and it can be strung across the chest, tied to the waist or the belt if small enough.

Apo: Pouches or bags and decorated sacs which can be made from woven fabric, beads or leather.

Ikodide: Also shortened as Ikoode and Ikoide, these are decorative parrot feathers added to hats, caps, hair and other head gear.

Ago: Wrist watches (Aago ọwọ).

Amure: These are traditional beaded, leather or fabric made girdles, baldrics, belts, bands, cords and sashes. they are usually tied across the waist over cloth (often called Igbaja in this style), or like an X across the chest (often called Ogbara or Ejigbara in this style).

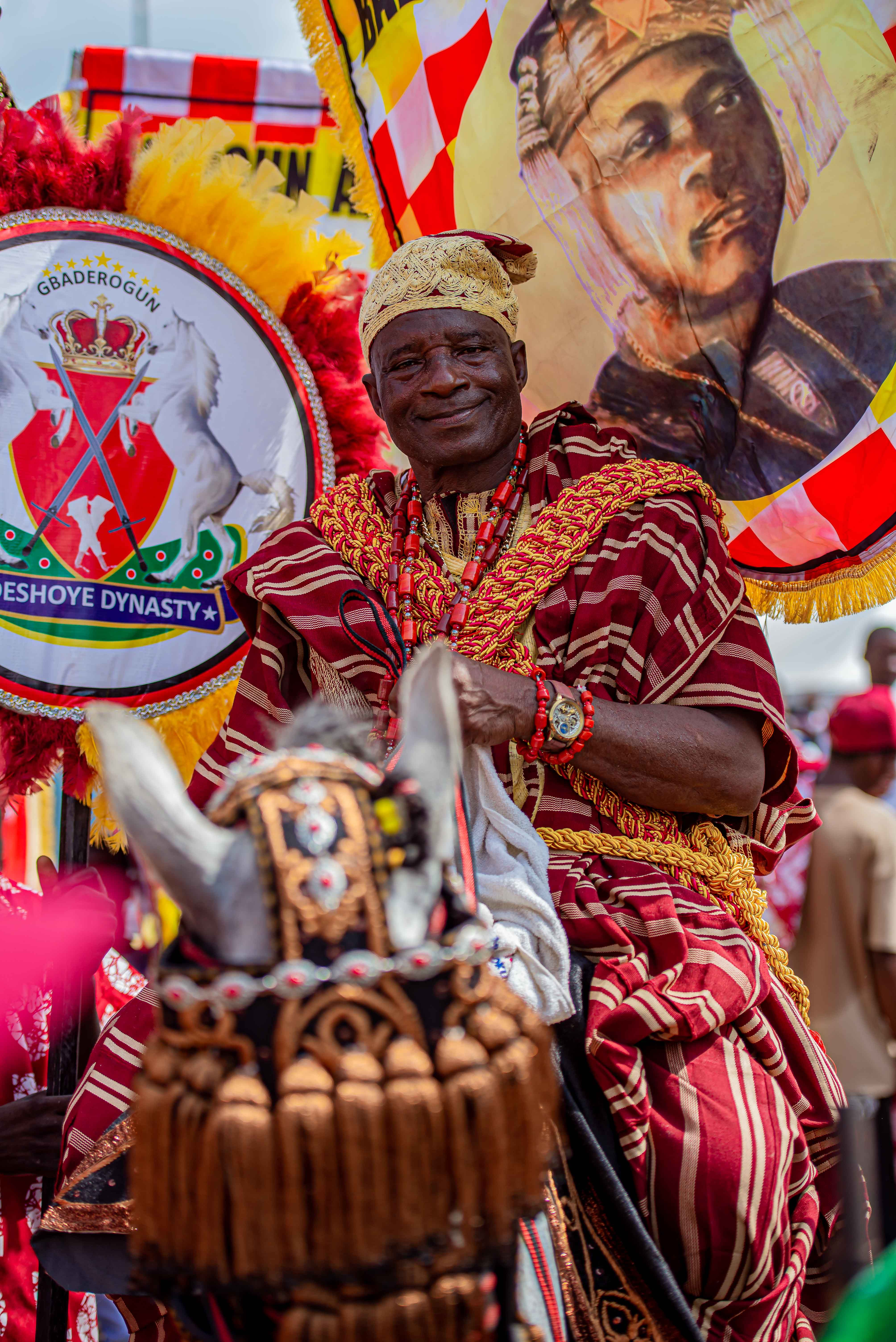
Yoruba men using fabric and beaded Ogbara cords across the torso.

== Beads and corded jewellery ==
Yoruba people adorn themselves with various beads generally known as Ileke, or cowries (owó), which are strung into corded jewellery called Egba.

Kele or Ikele are round / circular choker beads used as collars by certain dignitaries and devotee to certain orisha i.e Sango around their necks. Ilekes are of different types and can be round or spherical, tubular (pipe), rondelle, disc or oval. These include:

- Iyun — These are translucent red-yellow coral, carnelian, jasper or glass beads. They are one of the most valued.
- Segi — These are translucent blue-green glass or precious stone beads. They are also called Akori.
- Akun or Okun — These are opaque red stone beads.
- Sese Efun — The Sesefun are pure white beads, so named after their resemblance to chalk, (ẹfun).
- Erinla — These are striped yellow pipe beads or striped assorted colours.
- Other beads: Eyin Erin (beads made from Ivory), Opoto, Ikan, etc.

These beads are worn by Yoruba people on their necks, wrists, ears, ankles, waists, hair, arms, and around their heads, while kings go further and string them into shirts and tunics called 'Ewu Okun' or 'Ewu Ileke', and shoes; 'Bata Ileke' Other forms of used jewelry and accessories, which carry cultural significance include; Cowries (owó), while jewellery can be of gold (wura), silver (fadaka), copper (bàbà), brass (idẹ) and other metals.

== Aso Ebi ==
Aso Ebi lit. 'family cloth', is a cultural concept born out of the Yoruba principle of Alajobi (filial bond or kinship). It is a matching wear that is worn to events by family members and friends, including men, women and children. It is the belief of the Yoruba that when friendship exceeds a certain threshold of support, then such friends are seen or regarded as ‘family’. This is exemplified by the sayings; Ọrẹ bi ọmọ iya, meaning; 'A friend like maternal kindred', and Eniyan l'aṣọ mi; My people are my shield/clothing.

It is also worn by members of what are essentially social clubs or age-grade sets, where they are also called 'Aso Egbejoda' i.e group uniform. In the context of weddings, it is a series of stylish dresses worn by the bride's friends, groom's friends, bridesmaids, groomsmen, the bride and groom's families, and wedding guests to the event. For the women, it may include elements of the komole style.

== Fabrics ==
Yoruba clothing is made from both from indigenous Yoruba made fabrics, and imported fabrics which have become a staple in Yoruba culture. Some of the common fabrics used for making Yoruba clothing include, but are not linited to:

=== Aso Oke ===
Aso Oke or Aso Ofi is a hand-woven cloth of the Yoruba people, made in diverse patterns/designs and colours. It is considered one of the most prestigious traditional fabrics in Nigeria and is usually worn to festivals and occasions such as weddings and coronations. Some of the most prominent production centres are the cities of Iseyin in Oyo state and Ilorin, while Owo in Ondo state is particularly known for its several unique and beautiful varieties. The use of Aso oke is popular all over Yorubaland. Although theoretically, the colour combinations and patterns of Aso oke are limitless, some of the most popular favourites include:

- Etu — Deep blue and black with thin light blue or white striped patterns, giving a speckled effect. it is so named after the plumage of the guinea fowl, called Ẹtu in Yoruba. Black Etu are called Olowududu.
Two Aso oke panels of the Petuje (Etu) type during prduction in Owo
- Petuje — These are Aso oke with larger plaid/checkered or gridded patterns on lighter blue-purple bases. It is a sub-class of the Etu style. Its name means; 'kill and eat guinea fowl', but contextually, it connotes surpassing the Etu cloth.
- Sanyan — Beige or milky coloured. It is traditionally made from silk obtained from the cocoons of the Anaphe moth. It is highly valued.
- Alaari — Aso oke with a maroon or magenta coloured backdrop, striped by bands of different other hues. They are made from locally spun silk or cotton, coloured by traditionally dyeing in camwood (osùn) over several dips.

Some other types of Aso oke include: Ifun, fu or Angberen — a combination of light brown and navy blue woven cloth, Waka — a woven cloth of solid black background with one or two warp stripes of red. Aso-oke is made in various colours, patterns and designs. Some Aso-oke have beads or rhinestones on them, while others have embroidery and motifs such as stripes, checks, diamonds / lozenges, flowers, animals, or geometric shapes woven into them. All of these types can be woven plain or in the Onjawu or Jawu make, which is when Aso oke is woven with a traditional perforated lace-like design or interlaced with shiny metallic and shinning lurex threads or glitter dust, giving the finished products a sheen.

=== Adire ===
Adire is a Yoruba dyed fabric of various patterns and colours achieved through tie-dying, hand painting, stenciling, and stitched patterning. Adire can be made from various fabrics, and is done in three major ways which produces the three major types, including:

- Adire Eleko — This is made by applying wax or starch to certain sections of cloth before applying dye. It is also locally called batik, a similar style in southeast Asia.
- Adire Oniko — To make this, artisans tie threads, raffia, strings, etc around hundreds of pebbles or other items in individual sections of cloth before dyeing. It works by the resist dyeing principle.
- Adire Alabere — This is made by stitching together or sewing patterns into fabric before dyeing. It is a form of stitch resist dyeing.
- Adire Onibatani — This is Adire made from stamping stenciled patterns that have been pre-cut, into fabric.

Adire can be dyed in colours such as indigo blue, black, brown, green, white, or multicoloured.

=== Aran and Seda ===
Aran (cotton or linen velvet) and Ṣẹda (silk velvet) fabric or material are used to make traditional attires in Yorubaland for special occasions, and are highly valued.

=== Senghosen ===
Seghosen is a Yoruba cloth from the Owo Kingdom made from dyed cotton. The fabric is then decorated with intricate patterns and motifs that are either woven, embroidered, or appliqued.

=== Aso olona ===
Aso Olonais a woven cloth laden with patterns and symbols that have cultural and spiritual significance. It is especially popular among the Ijebu subgroup. Its name means "cloth with patterns" in Yoruba, and it is usually made from hand-spun white or indigo cotton, decorated with weft-float designs that depict water spirits, animals, plants, and other motifs. The cloth is also worn by chiefs, priests, and other members of the society on special occasions, ceremonies, festivals, and rituals. It is also used as a title cloth by the Ogboni society, and is considered a valuable heirloom and symbol of authority and prestige. Articles of clothing made from Aso Olona vary and include:

- Itagbe — A narrow, single panel shawl worn over the shoulder, or tied on the head.
- Iborun nla — Several strips of Aso Olona stitched together to make a large cloth that is usually tied as a wrapper by men and women or worn in the pakaja style.
- Shaki — Aso Olona woven with extensive Shagging or Piles. Its name is derived from its superficial resemblance to animal tripe in Yoruba.

=== Ankara ===
Ankara is a printed cotton fabric that originated from Indonesian batik dyed fabric designs via The Netherlands, but became popular in West Africa due to its colourful and vibrant patterns which Africans could resonate with. Ankara is also known as Dutch wax, African wax, or African print. There are Yoruba made Ankara cloth. Ankara can have various themes and symbols printed on it, such as flowers, animals, stars, or abstract shapes.

=== Eya (Lace) ===
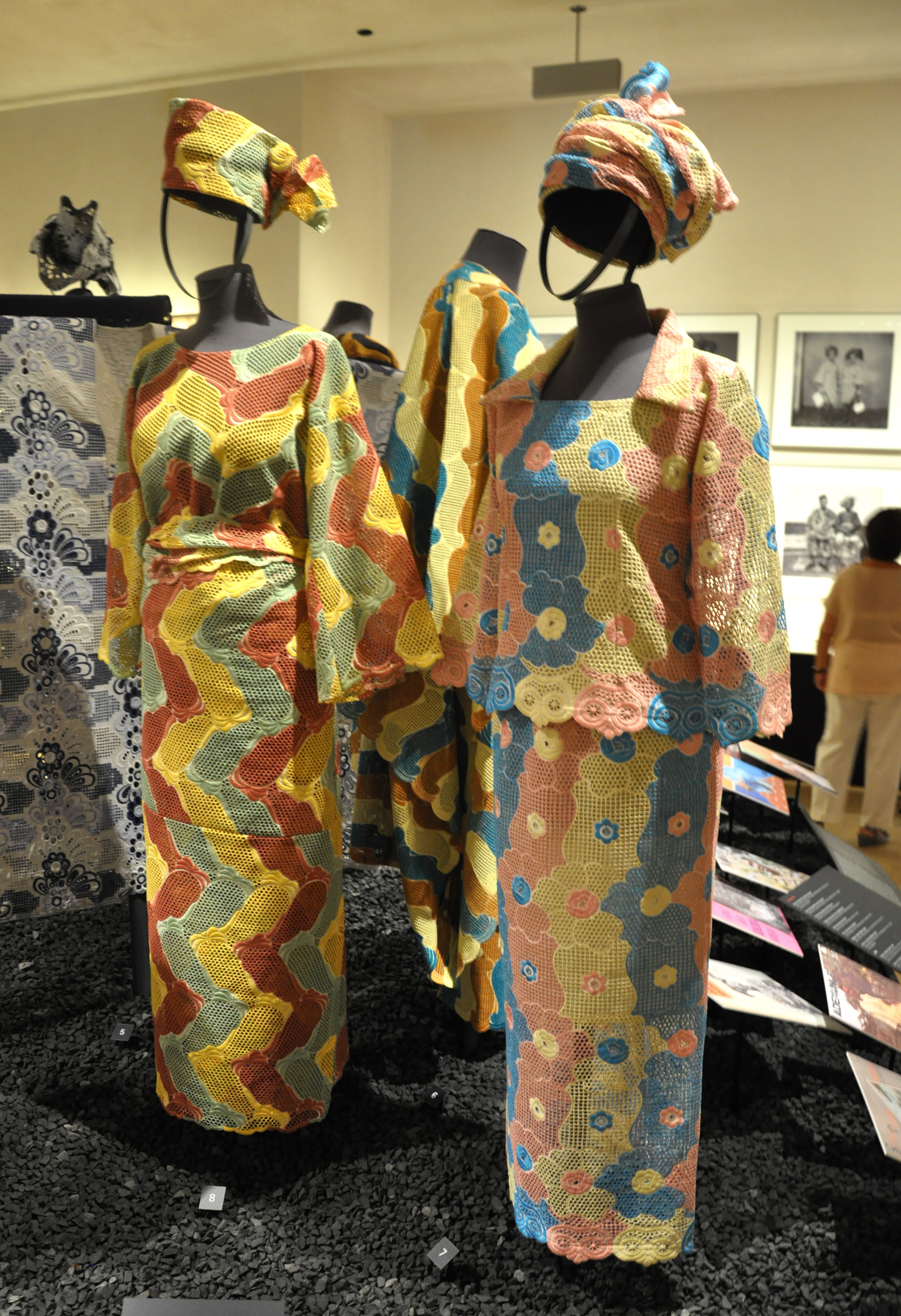
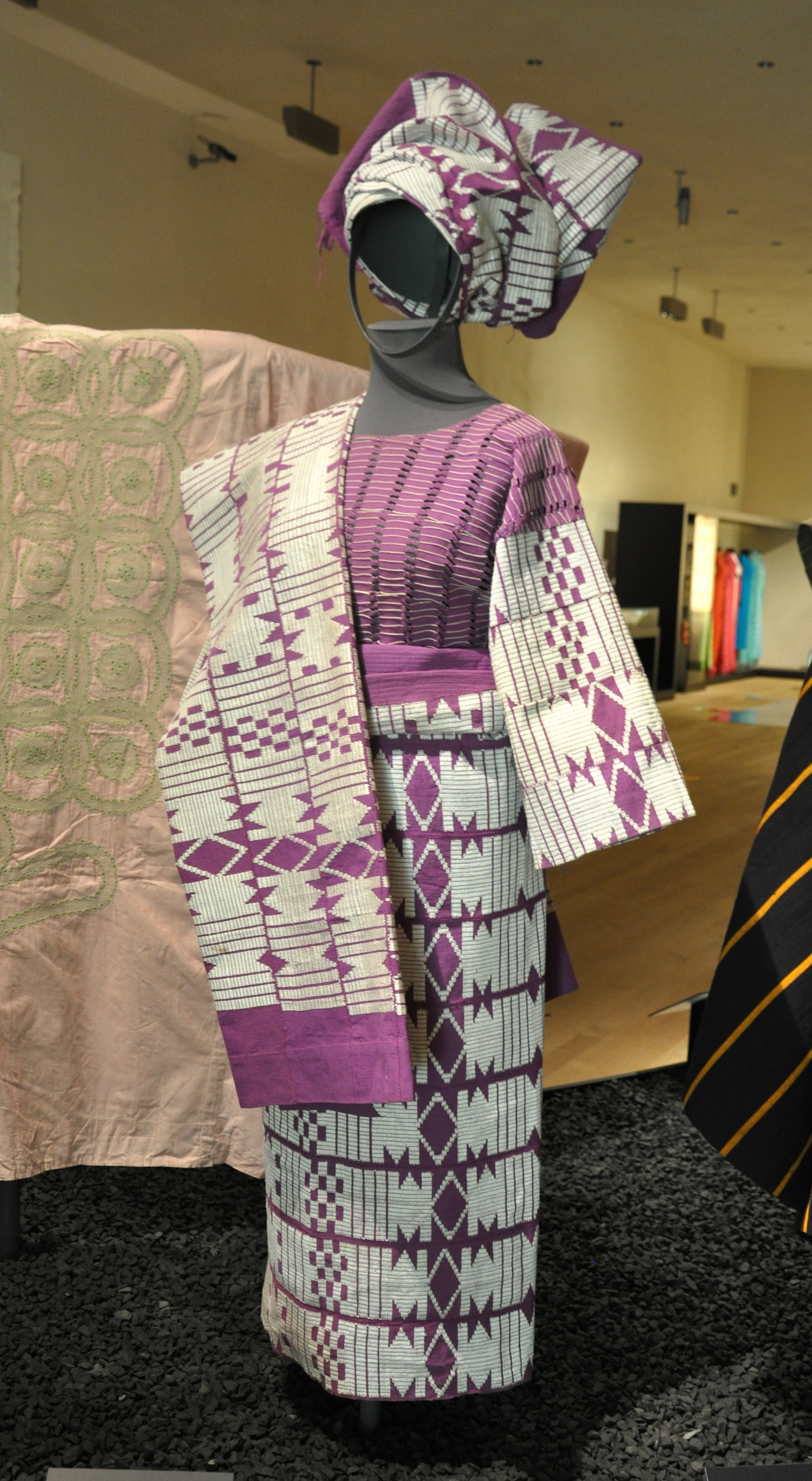
1970's era Iro and Buba with Gele in African Lace mterial (top) and Aso Oke (bottom).

Eya / Lace is a delicate fabric made from yarn or thread that is looped, twisted, or knotted to create intricate patterns. Lace can be made from various materials, such as cotton, silk, nylon, or polyester. Lace can have various styles and designs, such as guipure or sequin.

=== Olowonyo (Damask and Brocade) ===
Brocade and Damask, called Olowonyọ in Yoruba, are fabric that have complex patterns incorporated into them during the weaving process. Brocades and Damasks can be made from various materials, such as cotton, silk, wool, or synthetic fibers. They can have varied colours and textures, such as shiny, matte, smooth, or rough.

Buba and Sokoto of Damask

Simple Agbada made of African lace

Other fabrics include: Teru or Iteko — calico or bafta cloth, Baronje — satin.

=== Fabrics no longer in use ===
Kijipa: This was mainly used by regular and crafts people for mundane labor in the past. It had a rough texture and was made of raw hand spun cotton. Kijipa was valued for its strength and durability, and was woven on indigenous narrow and wide looms. It is no longer used today and may sometimes be closely depicted in some types of Yoruba historical movies. The Yoruba dictionary of 1852 describes it as; 'A coarse country cloth woven by women'. The kijipa was used to make a loincloth called bante, used to cover the mid body and groin area, and as work clothes by laborers and farmers.

Elegheghe: The Elegheghe was the local cloth of the highest quality in Owo kingdom and was usually presented as gifts to august visitors. It had two prominent types. Elegheghe Dudu and Elegheghe Pupa.

Aso-ipo: A thick blanket-like red and tan patterned cloth made by the Bunu and Okun, used in burial, funerary and memorial rites of prominent people, and also in the costumses of some msquerades. There are five different types based on size and design: Ifale, Abata, Ebe, Oja and Aponuponyin.

== Important notes ==
- The use of Aso-oke dates back to the ancient times in Yorubaland, when it was worn by Yoruba kingdoms, such as Oyo, Ife, Owo, Ijebu, etc
- The use of Adire dates back to the ancient times, when it was used by the Yoruba people for ritual and ceremonial purposes. The Yoruba people developed various techniques and methods of dyeing, such as shibori, and eleko.
- Aran was created in Yorubaland centuries ago.
- Seghosen dates back to the ancient Yoruba kingdom of Owo.
- Aso Olona / Itagbe dates back to the ancient Yoruba kingdom of Ijebu.
- The use of Ankara dates back to the colonial era, when it was introduced by European traders and missionaries who brought it from the East Indies. The Yoruba people adapted it to their own tastes and preferences, creating unique and diverse patterns and styles.
- The use of lace dates back to the pre-colonial and colonial eras, when it was imported from Europe and Asia which then inspired local Yoruba ones to be made by indiginious weavers. Both Imported and local lace are in use today.

== Popular culture and contemporary influence ==
Yoruba clothing has been an impactful part of the Nigerian and African cultural scenes. The clothing showcases the diversity, beauty, and richness of Yoruba people and by extension the African continent and its people. It also inspires and influences other forms of art and media expressions, such as music, dance, literature, and cinema. For example:

- The clothing is often featured in Nigerian movies, especially in Nollywood, the Nigerian film industry. The clothing is used to portray different characters, settings, themes, and genres of movies.
- The clothing is often worn by Nigerian musicians, especially in Afrobeats, a Nigerian music genre. The clothing is used to express different moods, messages, styles, and genres of music.
- The clothing is often celebrated in Nigerian literature, especially in novels, poems, and essays. The clothing is used to describe different scenes, emotions, personalities, and stories.
- The clothing is often admired by Nigerian dancers, especially in traditional dances. The clothing is used to enhance different movements, rhythms, gestures, and expressions.
- The clothing is often admired by Nigerian fashionistas, especially in Fashion shows. The clothing is used to embrace and enhance different movements, posts, blends, gestures, and expressions.

Yoruba garments have evolved over centuries, adapting to changes in fashion, lifestyle, and societal norms.
