= Yoruba traditional wedding =

Traditional marriage practices of the Yoruba people

Traditional marriage in Yoruba culture is called Igbeyawo(Literal meaning:Taking a Bride). It is an important aspect of Yoruba culture. Yoruba weddings feature Yoruba traditional clothing as well as Yoruba food, music and relevant cultural practices. The wedding stage is divided into pre-wedding, wedding and post-wedding activities.

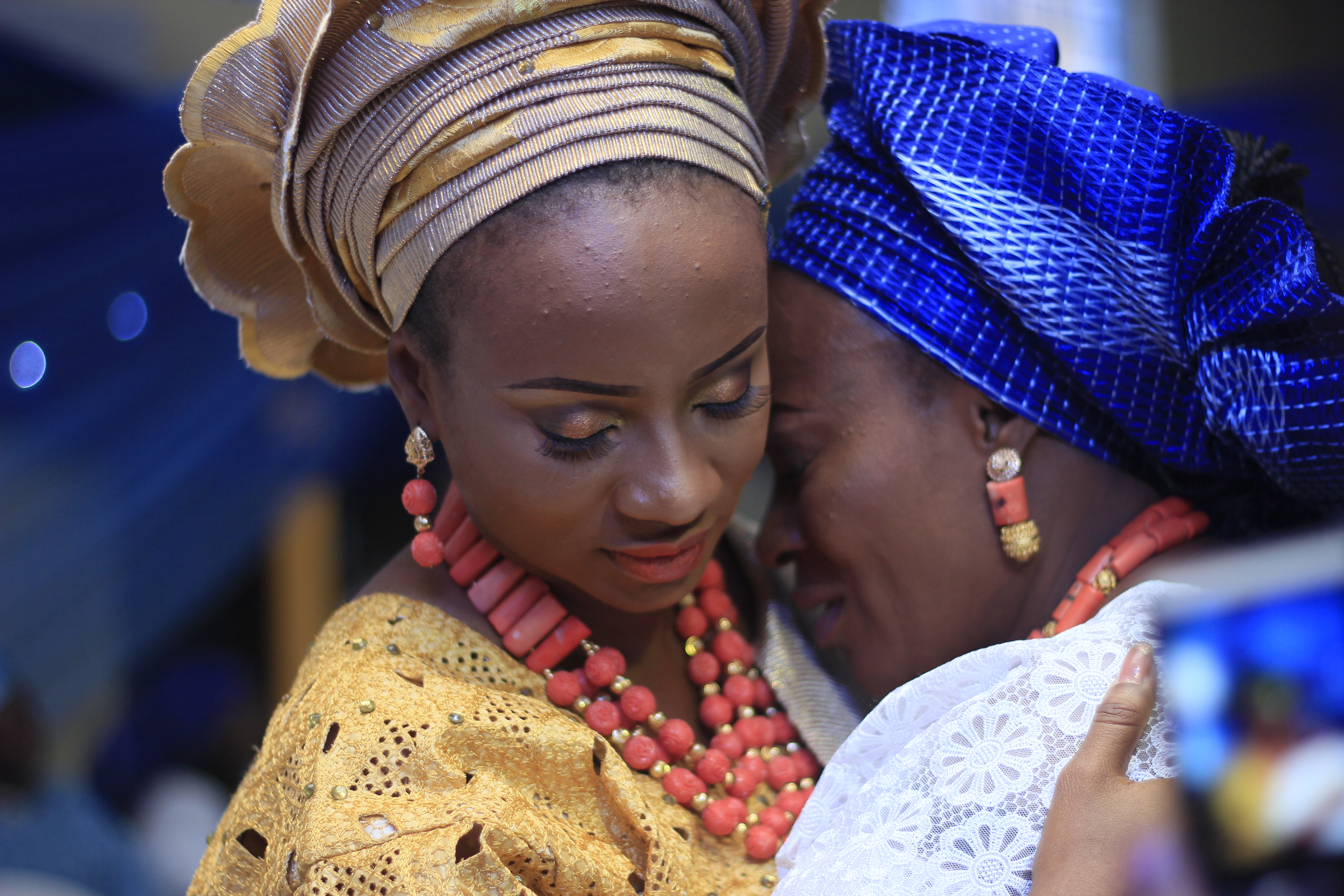
Yoruba Bride and her mother

== Family introduction ==
This is an important pre-wedding Yoruba practice. The two families have a day of important meeting. After the engagement is announcement to the families, then the bride's family will set a date for the families to meet. This meeting is held in the home of one of the family members. It seems like a mini-traditional wedding before the real wedding. Traditional Yoruba attire is worn and there is food and drinks. Also, photos of the event are usually taken.

== Eru Iyawo list ==
Eru Iyawo are the gifts the bride and her family are given. The list is compiled by the oldest member of the Brides family. The list is given to the husband's family. It usually contains more of symbolic items. It usually includes honey, yams, fruits, engagement rings, Isa asun (pot), amu (water pot) and jewellery. The Eru Iyawo is a dynamic list with different items while core items are found in most. If dowry is requested, that is given to the family of the bride. During the pre wedding stage, the bride and groom go on to take pre wedding photoshoots in traditional attire.

== Igbeyawo ==
This is the wedding proper. A Yoruba wedding is usually a multi-day event, often preceding or after the church or Islamic wedding and court wedding (legal marriage). In most cases, it is done on a different day. The Yoruba wedding is usually done in a large building or hall or in an open space. It is a big event with Yoruba traditional outfits and food made by chefs, cooks or catering services. The guests are usually numerous and features friends and family if both parties.

The guests wear Yoruba outfits and many in age groups, friend groups or connected somewhat to the bride's or groom's family wear Asoebi, matching Yoruba outfits. The groom wears an Agbada and Fila. The bride wears an Iro ati Buba and Gele, or Komole and Gele, this is paired with an Ipele on the shoulder. The outfits of the couples are usually tailor made in varieties of Asooke, Brocade, Damask, Aran, Eya (Lace) and other Yoruba fabrics. Usually the bride has more than one outfit for the event and the groom as well. There is usually a room to change into outfits. Some Yoruba brides and grooms can also wear pakaja amongst their outfits styles.

Depending on the bride's Yoruba subgroup, like the Owos, also some outfits like an Iro dress, using seghosen, among the outfits. The Yoruba bride holds either an Irukere (faux horse tail)or an Abebe, a traditional Yoruba handfan. The bride's fan can have things written on it like "Wife of (grooms name)" sometimes. Iyawo or aya is used, as those two words means wife in Yoruba. The groom is called Oko. The outfits are accessorised by jewellery or traditional Yoruba beads of different colours, like Iyun and Segi. Among the jewelry includes gold, silver, precious stones and other types. Fashion is important in a Yoruba wedding.

Some of the events that occur during the wedding are as follows. The groom and his friends prostrates (dobale) before the brides family to show respect. The bride enters, usually dancing in, kneels to greet her parents, then the grooms parents and then the groom. The Eru Iyawo is given. The Brides places the grooms Fila on his head to show acceptance. The fila is either removed and then added back to show this gesture. The alternative is the groom not wearing the fila until then, or the Bride replacing it with another Fila. If there are rings, that will be exchanged. Money is sprayed on the bride and groom as they dance on.

Yoruba dishes are served to the guest while the ceremony goes on. Rites and cultural norms are observed. There is usually singing, including many of the weddings having life bands. Traditional Yoruba dancers or dance trope usually feature, they were traditional dancing attires.

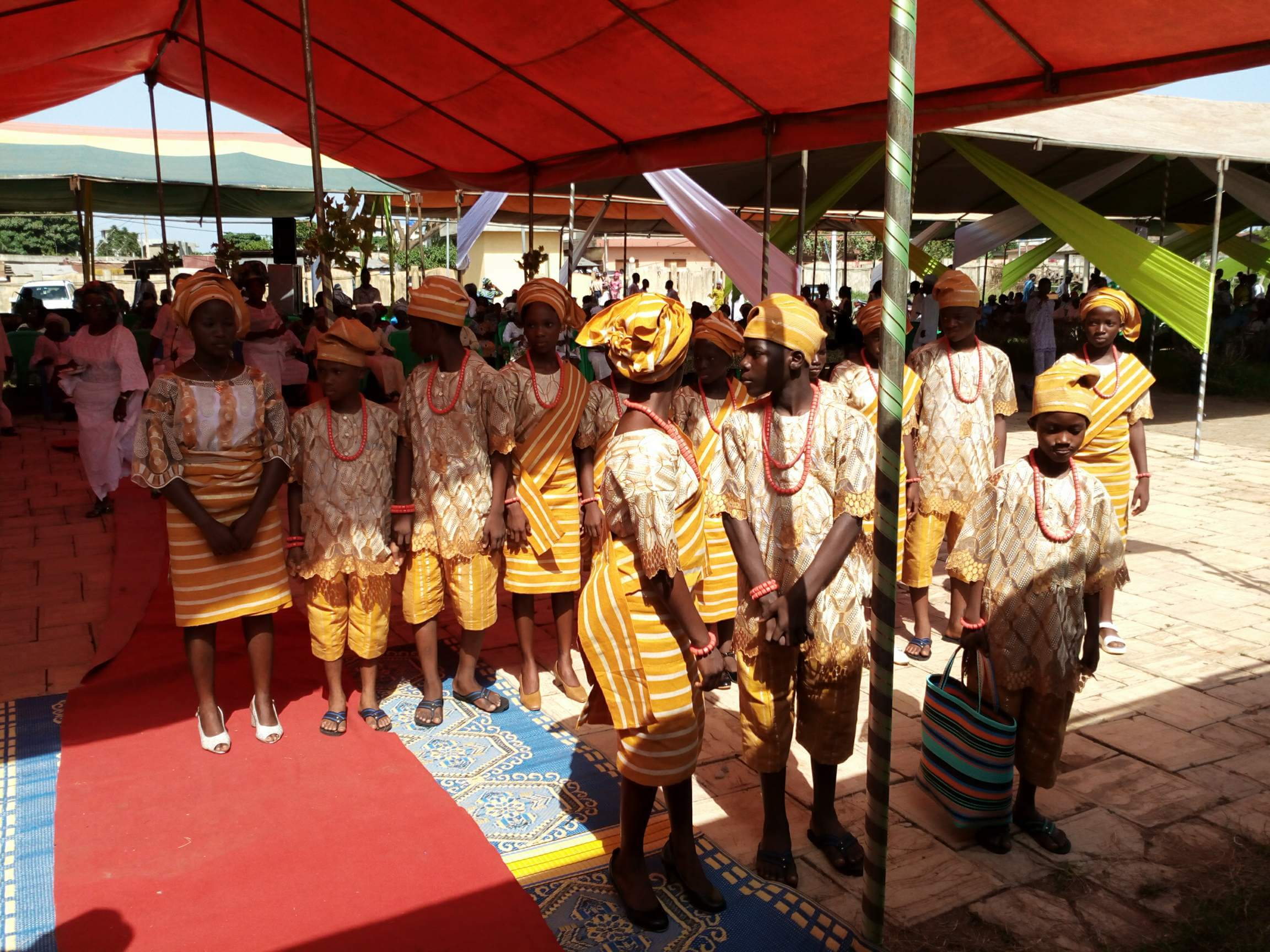
Yoruba traditional wedding ceremony with children dancers wearing Asooke

Alaga is also present, who is a trained Yoruba praise singer and traditional wedding host. The alaga is a part of Yoruba wedding traditions. The two types of alaga are: the alaga Iduro (standing alaga) and alaga Ijoko (sitting alaga). The wedding has either one. An MC can also be present at the wedding, to coordinate the event as well and alongside. Photos are often taken and there are usually videographers.

== After-party ==
This is usually called Owanbe (or Owambe). The after-party can be the same or different depending on the couple. It is usually after the official wedding with more partying involved. The guests and bridegroom usually change into other Yoruba outfits with more of a casual and party appeal. The married couple are the star of the show and celebrate their newly wedded married life. The guests and family also dance and money is sprayed. There is a DJ set and there can be live bands. It is usually held in a hall, in an event center, hotel or ballroom like setting. It can continue into the night until the bridegroom retires. The after-party could be done on a different day as well. The married couple can then go on a honeymoon or start their married life.
