= Iro ati Buba =

Traditional Yoruba women's clothing ensemble

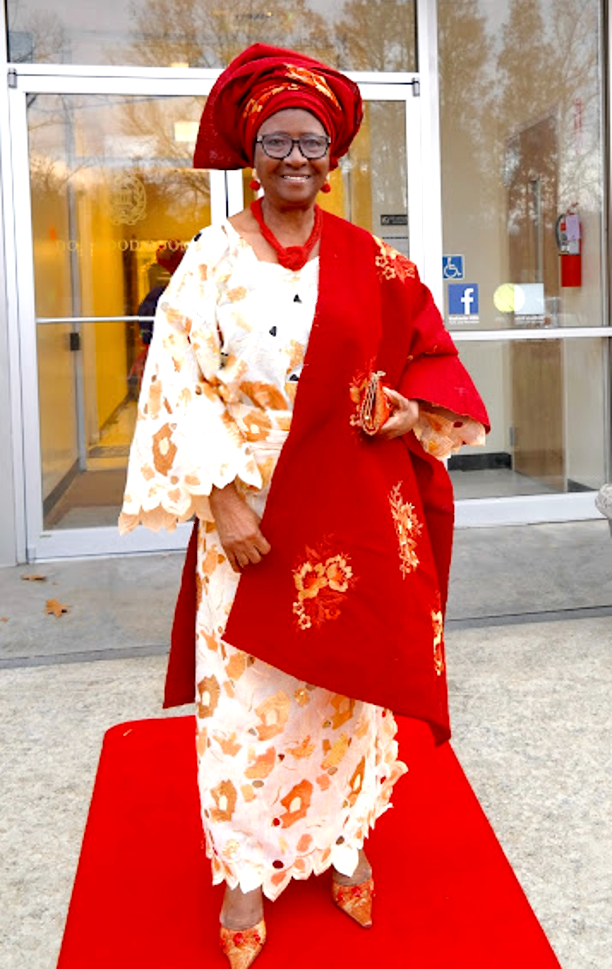
Yoruba woman in Iro ati Buba with Gele and Ipele

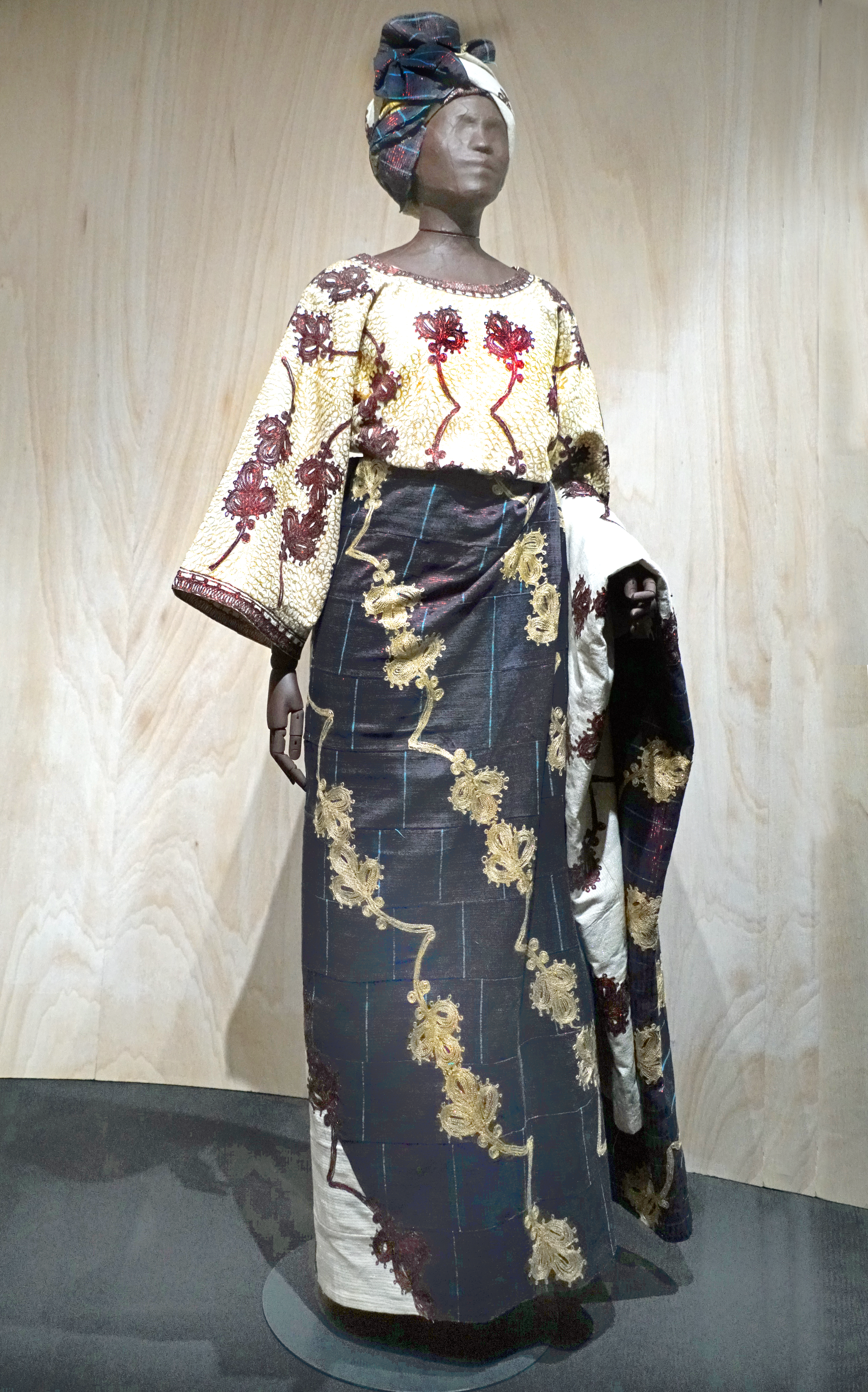
Iro ati buba on a mannequin

Iro ati Buba also known as Iro and Buba, is a traditional Yoruba women's clothing ensemble. It consists of a long sleeved blouse called buba and a wrap around wrapper called iro. They come in different types and styles. Some iro are long and while some are short and belong to an ensemble called Oleku. Oleku is usually seen among younger women, while the regular iro ati buba is common among age groups.

There are iro ati buba that are fancy, or more formal and the ones that are casual as well. Depending on the type, they are worn for different events including Weddings, parties, festivities, formal gatherings, business and at home as well.

Iro ati Buba is commonly paired with Gele and ipele, especially at festivities, Weddings and parties. It can also be paired with a single scarf, or ibori, or without. Iro ati buba can be made in several fabrics including, Aso-oke, Aso olona, Adire, Seghosen, Brocade, Damask, etc.

== See also ==
- Yoruba clothing
- Aso oke
- Adire
- Gele
