= Fila onide =

Traditional Yoruba cap embroidered with brass, silver or golden threads

Two popular Fila Onide Yoruba cap types on mannequin models

Fila Onide, Ide or Asinde Yoruba men cap

Fila onide lit. 'cap of brass' or Fila asinde lit. 'brass-embroidered caps', are native Yoruba caps traditionally made from velvet (Àrán) fabric and brass, silver or golden thread-work. Its name is derived from the elaborate employment of brass in its making and outlook, and directly translates as 'brass caps' (idẹ) in Yoruba.

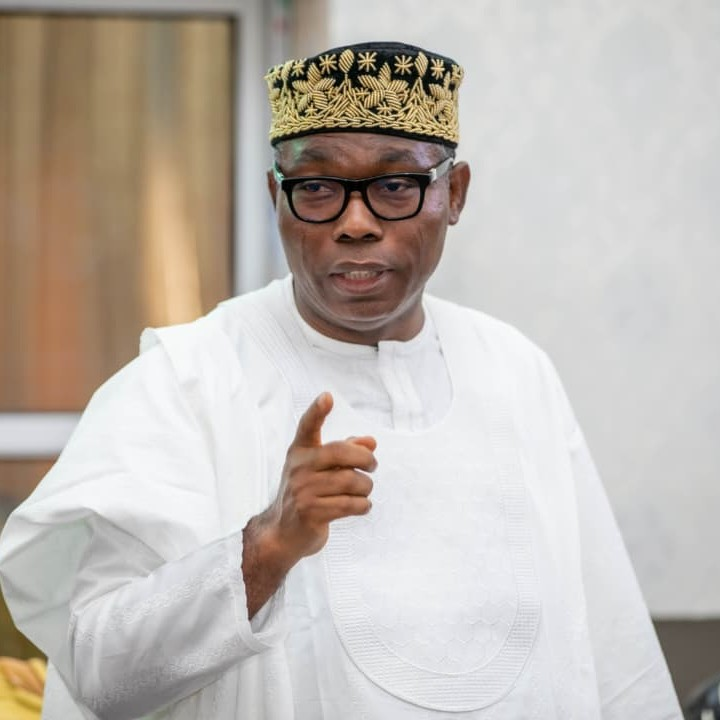
Presidential candidate of the SDP in the 2027 Nigerian general election, Adewole Adebayo in Fila onide

Fila onide is usually of two types; the flat topped variety colloquially called 'kufi' and the foldable / droopy topped variety called 'elelo'. It features large and intricately braided golden/yellow/brass embroidery on the top and around (hence its name). Both types sometimes feature a hanging tassel (winjin-winjin). Shoes of a similar design and colour (Bata onide) are also sometimes made to match the caps.

== Production ==
Yoruba men in traditional attire. Middle man is wearing a Fila onide

The major materials and tools needed for the production of onide caps (hats) are; Toro ide (small brass ingots), shape stencils, nails for perforations, a hardboard, coloured twines and threads, cassava starch paste, needles, a semi-stiff inlay/stay, and velvet fabric. Beads are optional.

=== Process ===
To make the cap, starched bean bags are used as a stay for pieces of pre-cut velvet fabric of the cap itself. The purpose of this, is to allow the brass threads stay firm on them. Stencils of different motifs are then cut, and their shapes are transferred onto the velvet material using a pencil or a pen. The patterns are repeated several times until the circumference of the hat is covered. There are accepted catalogue of motifs from which each producers can draw, and they generally fall into five categories/types:

- Natural motifs — These include images of objects like cowries, shells, and nuts, and can be broadly classified as:
  - Floral (plant) motifs
  - Zoomorphic (animal) motifs
- Geometric motifs — These include lines; curved and non curved, broken and non broken, hatched and non hatched.
- Traditional motifs.
- Abstract motifs — A plethora of shapes uniquely created by the designers.
- Dots and bull eyes motifs.

The fabric pieces are then brought together using a sewing machine, and the traced stencil outlines are carefully embroidered by the hands of skilled craftspeople (or machines). According to producers in Oyo State, the majority of the velvet cap materials were usually procured from the capital city – Ibadan. However, the beans bags used were usually bought at local Hausa grain markets.

== Market and sale ==
Fila onide has become one of the most popular type of caps in Nigeria. It can be made styled into various shapes, including Gobi or Elelo and Kufi. The most popular colours are black and red, with others such as blue, yellow, and green occurring at lesser frequencies based on demand. The producers in Ogbomosho, Iseyin and Oyo towns also produce them for eastern Nigerian markets, where they are popular and highly patronized.

== Patent rights ==
The production of Fila onide, as well as the various proprietary motifs/patterns and designs are currently unable to acquire patent rights that restrict copycat reproduction, and the unlawful proliferation of these products artistic impressions are therefore unchecked. This has affected the entrepreneurship of traditional Fila onide producers in Nigeria. The majority of makers (72%) also identify competition from foreign makers (or demand for foreign products) as well as unfavourable government policies as major challenges.

== Gallery ==
Fila onide (man on the right)

== See also ==
- Fila (hat)
- Yoruba men's clothing
- Gele (headdress)
