= Pakaja =

Yoruba toga-like traditional cloth

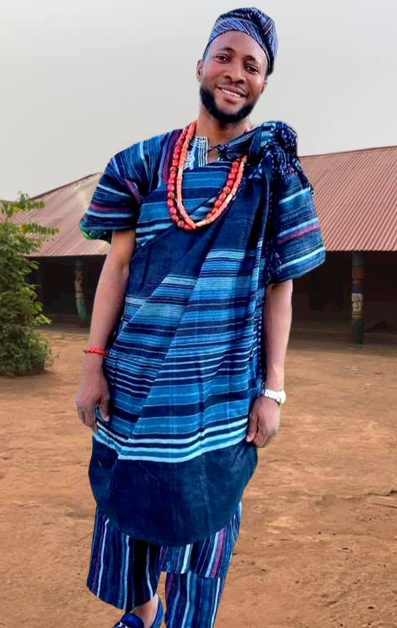
Yoruba man dressed in Kaja with a Gogowu robe, Gobi cap and Kembe

Yoruba man dressed in Pakaja with Iborun, Esiki and Fila Gobi

Pakaja also known as Ibora Oke, or simply as Kaja is a type of Yoruba clothing style worn by men and women in different styles. The Yoruba dictionary of 1852 describes it as passing a 'country cloth' from under the arm to the shoulder.

It is a Toga-like style. Kaja is the name of the outfit itself while to Pa Kaja is the verbal act of wearing it which may also substitute as the name of the dressing style. Pakaja can be donned in any fabric of choice.

== Types and variations ==
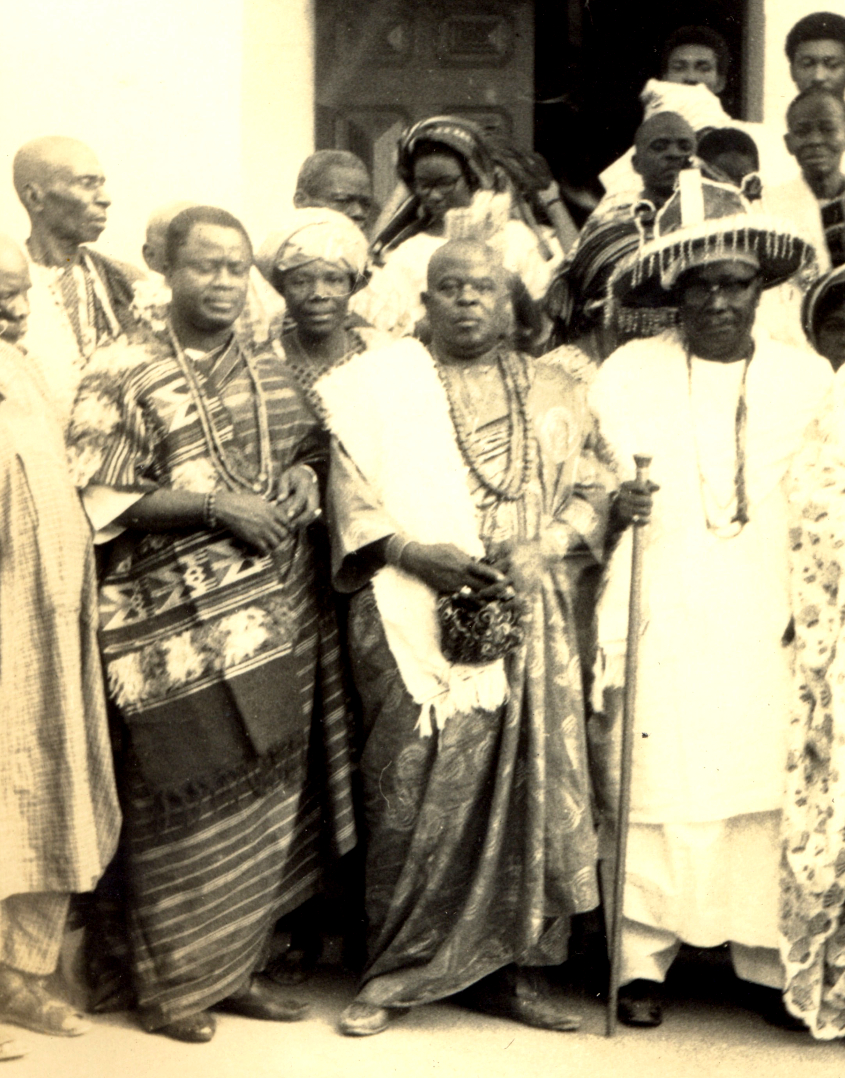
Yoruba men in Pakaja attire and Itagbe Aṣọ Ọlọna at the Alake's palace, Abeokuta, 1972

The Kaja can be done with one or two wrappers, and can be knotted on one or both shoulders. There are two main styles/types:

- Guru — This is when the toga leaves a trail/train that can be left fallen or held in the arm when moving around.
- Gogowu — This is the style, as well as the large wrapper draped around the body, on the Buba or Kukumo (Togo) vest when going out, but which doesn't touch the ground.

== See also ==
- Yoruba clothing
- Fila (hat)
