= Abebe (handfan) =

Traditional Yoruba hand fan

A former Alake of Abeokuta in a courtyard, flanked by people holding large decorated circular Abebe handfans

Abebe (Yoruba: Abẹ̀bẹ̀) is a Yoruba traditional handfan. It is commonly used by everyday people such as gentlemen and brides during their wedding ceremonies.

It is also used as an insignia of office by royalty and chieftains or titled people (Oloye), as well as in religious contexts, historically as well as in the present. Abebe is of various types, and its use can range from ornamental to ceremonial or functional (such as in cooling the body) as an object in Yoruba society. Traditional abebe may be made from various materials including fabric/cloth, metal, grass/raffia, leather, etc.

== Cultural expression and Isese ==
Yoruba man holding traditional Abebe

The Abebe features as an important part of Yoruba cultural expressions, such as in the regalia of some Yoruba masquerades, such as the Gelede and Efe performances. A 2024 study of the Egungun Elewe tradition of Ila-Orangun describes the local abẹ̀bẹ̀ as an important element of the masquerade's costume. It is also used by chiefs and other titled men in society.

Ritual Abebe Images

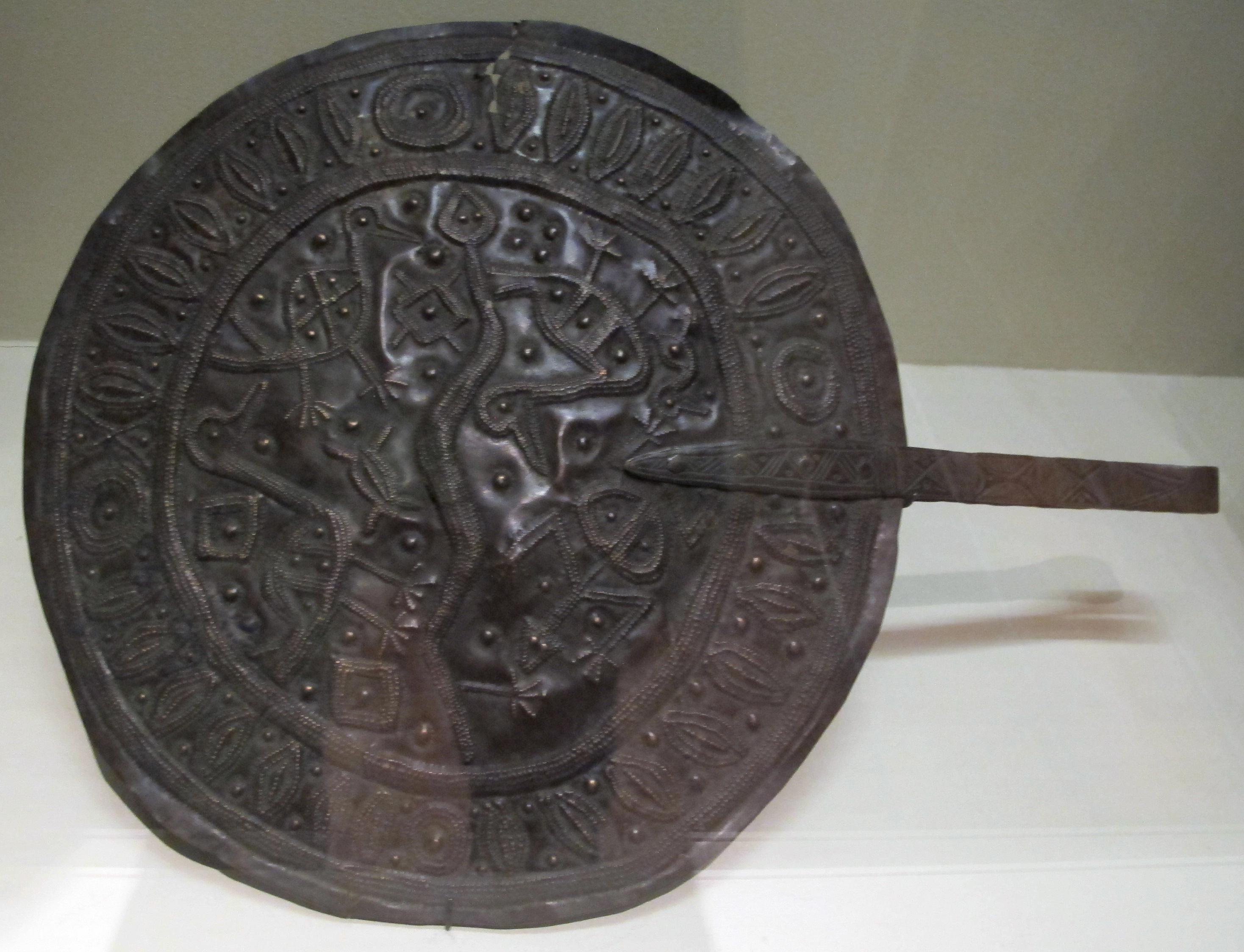
Brass and leather Abebe

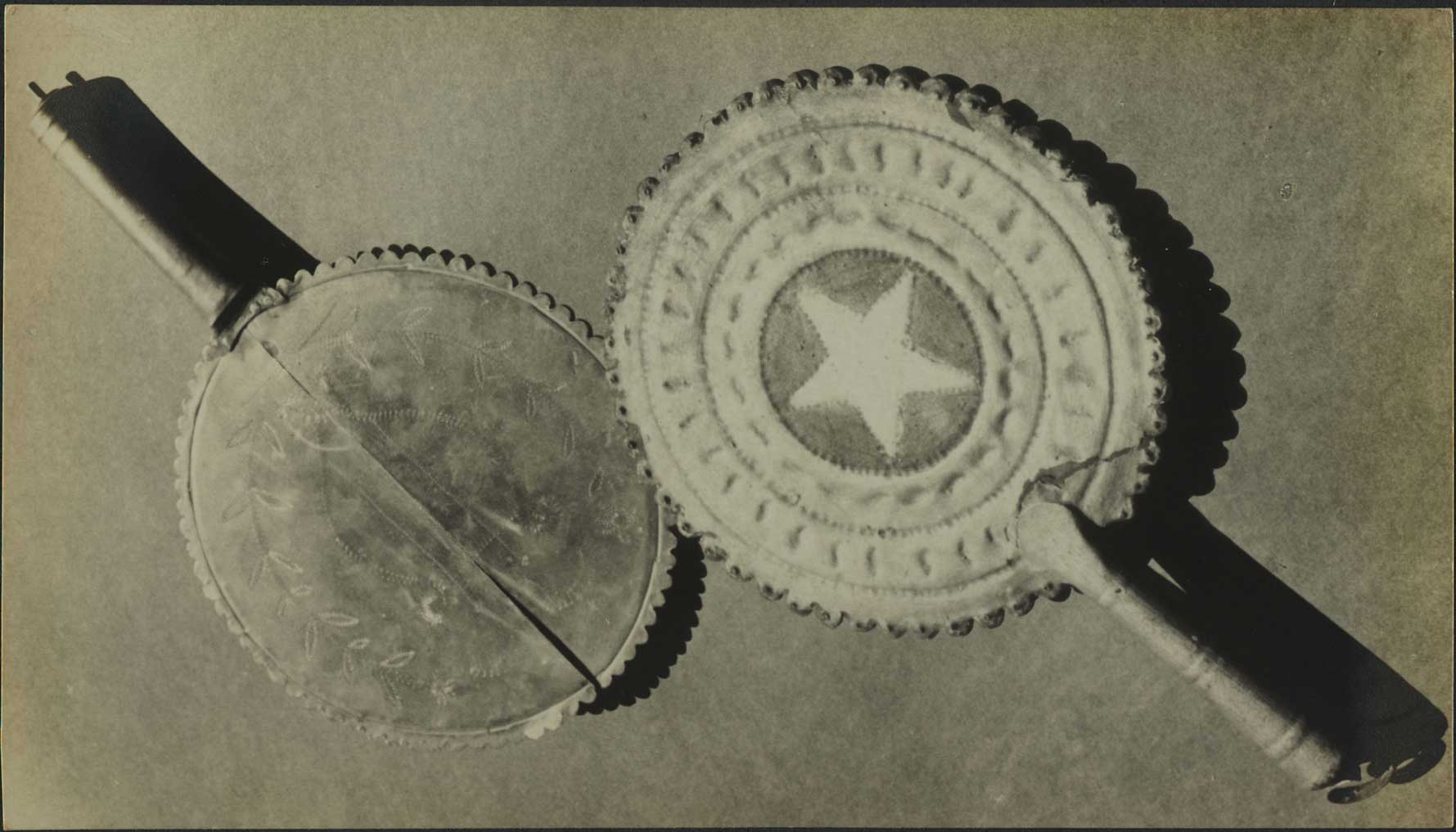

Abebe fans also play a role in Yoruba religious traditions. Circular fans made of brass (Abẹbẹ Idẹ) are particularly associated with water related deities, such as Osun, the Yoruba orisha associated with the Osun River, and Yemoja, the orisha of the ogun River. Fans used in Osun rituals may be decorated and carried during ritual processions. Abebe is also traditionally used by Yemoja devotees. The Sacred Arts of the Black Atlantic collection at Duke University identifies a pair of Yoruba abebe used in ritual processions for Osun.

== Brides and Weddings ==
The abebe is also used as an accessory in Yoruba traditional wedding attire. A Yoruba bride may carry an abebe alongside other traditional assesories, as well as the Irukere. Bridal abebe may be decorated to complement the bride's clothing and can be personalized with inscriptions relating to the Bride.

Ceremonial Abebe Images

Bride with Abebe

Bride with Abebe.

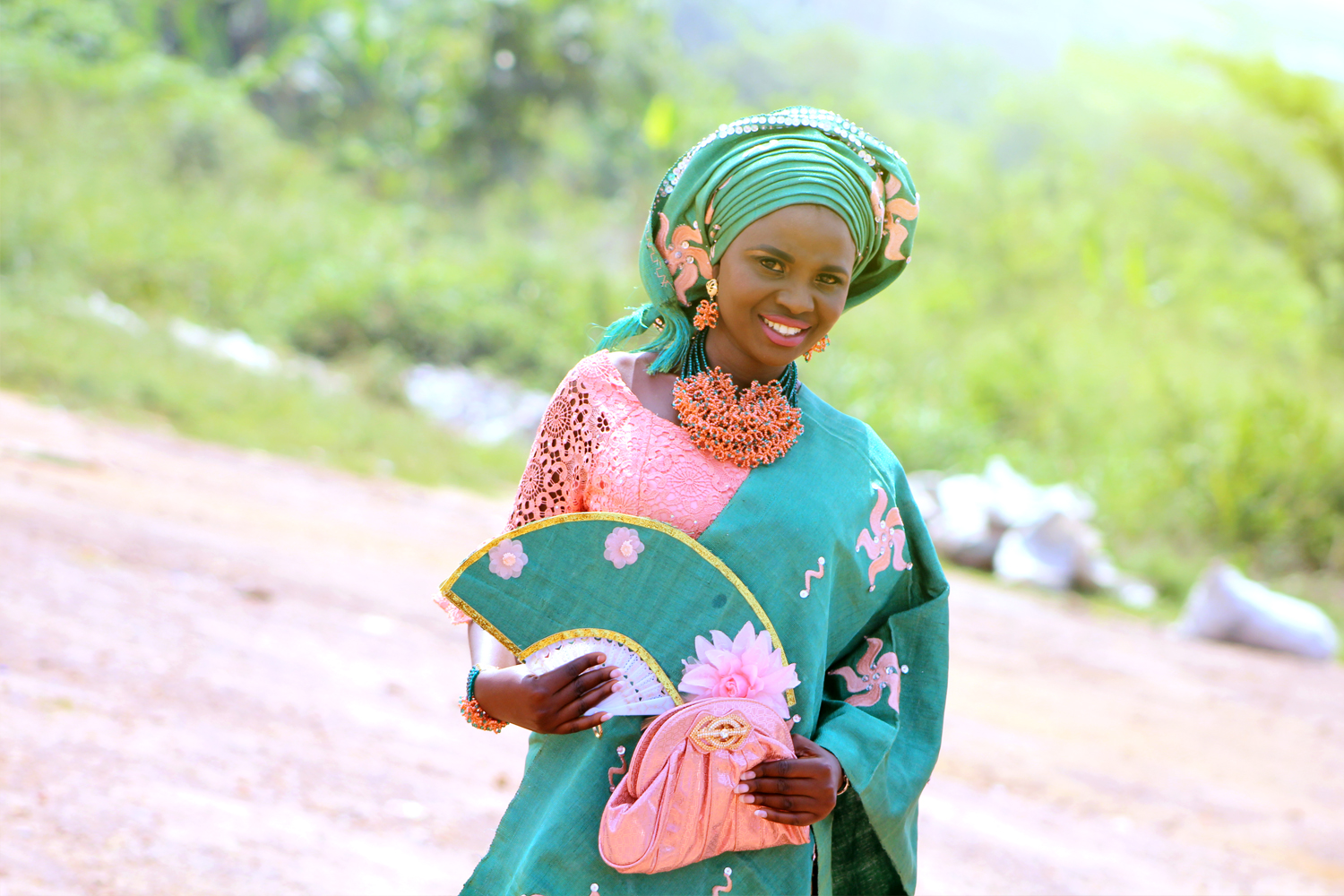
Bride with Abebe
