= Aso olona =

Yoruba patterned hand-woven fabric

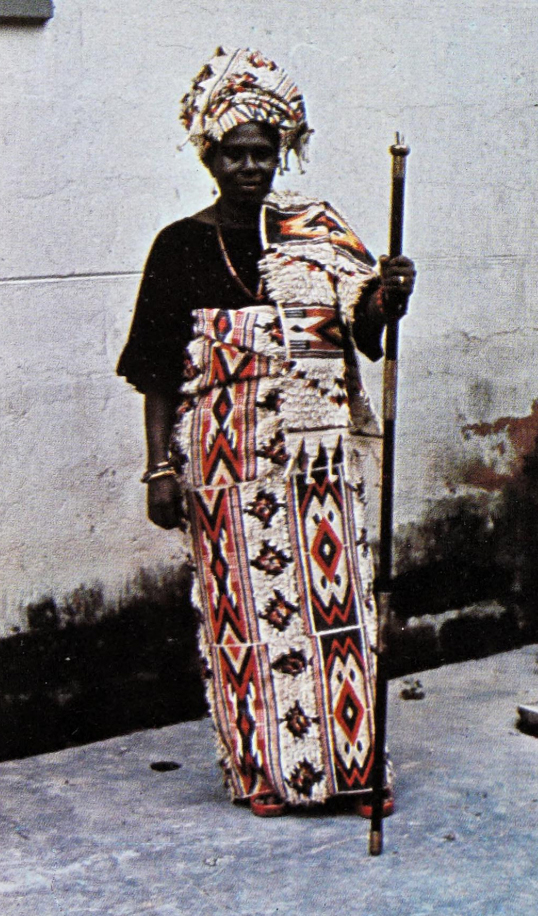
Aso Olona clothing as Ibora nla and Itagbe, worn by an Osugbo Ijebu woman

Aso Olona (Yoruba: Aṣọ Ọlọ́nà) lit. 'cloth of patterns', is a traditional Yoruba woven textile traditionally made in three or four panels on upright framed looms called Òfì, and is well known for its intricate geometric patterns and cultural significance, particularly among the Ijebu subgroup. The term "Aso Olona" translates into 'cloth with patterns'. It usually features geometric and stylized animal motifs such as chameleons, tortoise, mudfish, fish heads (agbáríẹja), crocodiles (ọ̀nì), frogs (ọ̀pọ̀lọ́), snakes (ejò), lizards (aláǹgbá), elephants (erin), and a host of others.

The patterns and symbols often woven into the Aso olona carry semiotic meanings, they can also be connected to the lineage of the wearer. Among the zoomorphic motifs is that of the chameleon (Agẹmọ), the national symbol of Ijebu Yorubas. The cloth made from it is used in a variety of Yoruba traditional attires, and can be worn in different styles including; the Kaja or Pakaja, a toga-style outfit; Iro ati Buba, a combination of a traditionally round-neck, loose-fitting blouse and a wrapper. It's also paired with accessories like Gele (head-tie), Ipele (second wrapper, shawl or stole), Iborun (shawl) and adorned with beads and jewelry that hold cultural significance.

== Use and function ==
Aso Olona cloth behind a Gele model

A sample of Aso olona

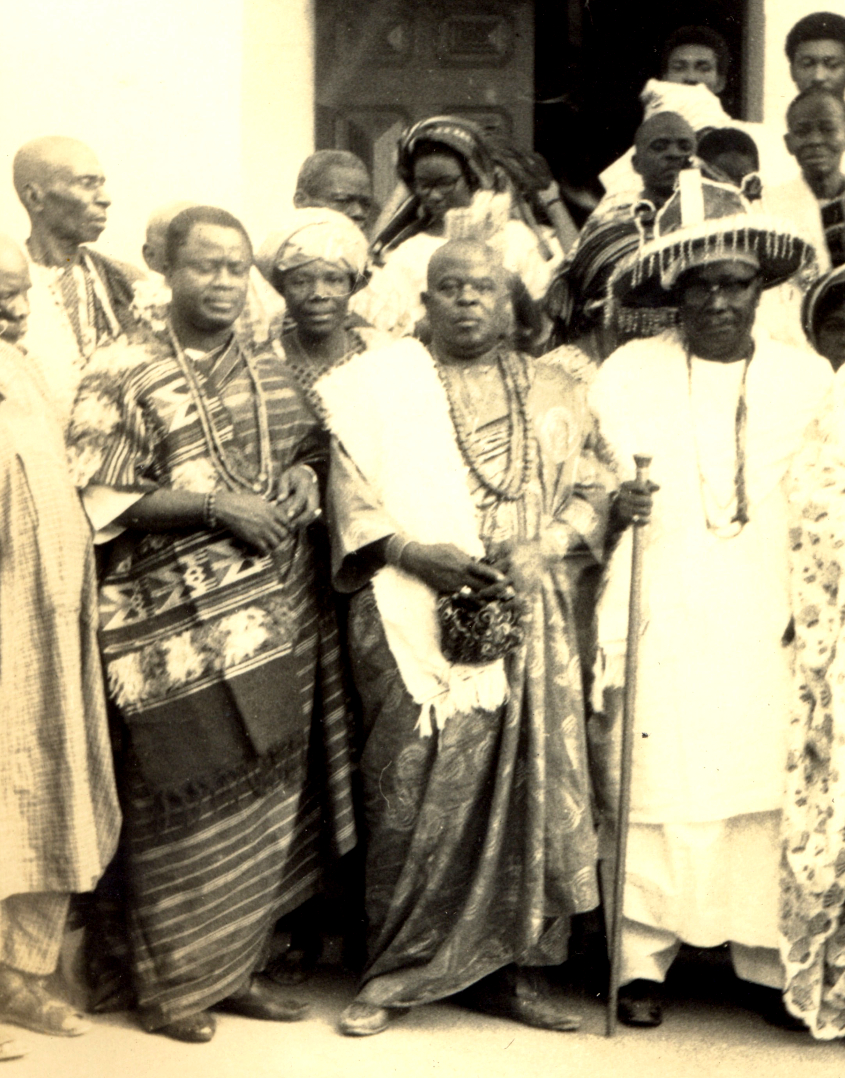
Yoruba man with shoulder shawl of Aso Olona (Itagbe) dressed in Kaja (pakaja) style

The cloth is usually used as a title cloth or insignia in the Ogboni society, which is a powerful fraternal institution of elders and leaders in Yoruba society. The narrow Aso Olona single panel 'ipele' thrown over the shoulders is called Itagbe, while the full-sized Aso Olona is known as the Ìborùn Nlá. Both were especially common for Ogboni a.k.a. Oshugbo events.

The cloth is also worn by chiefs, priests, and other members of the society on special occasions, such as ceremonies, festivals, rituals and other significant events, not only as a fashion statement, but also as a representation of identity and connection to Yoruba heritage. It is regarded as a valuable heirloom and a symbol of authority and prestige. The design of the Aso Olona frequently features a Shag, known in Yoruba as Ṣàkì (Shaki), which is made by weaving supplemental threads through a small grouping of warp threads, leaving the ends hanging in front, to be worn outward for maximum visibility. In principle, members of the Ogboni are meant to carry their Itagbe on their left shoulders, while chiefs and other titled people are meant to carry it on their right, although, it is not always so in practice. Tying the Itagbe on the head, however, is a more reliable indicator of Ogboni membership.

== History of trade ==
The Ijebu have been actively trading cloth in the Niger Delta for the past 400 years plus, as far back as the 16th century, and the clothing-ware they produced was highly sought after along the Gulf of Guinea coast. European sources mention in the early 1600s that one of the items of trade sourced from Ijebu (Xabu) was cotton cloths of 'very curious' patterns, which are worn by the populations of Sao Tome.

=== Introduction into the Niger Delta ===
Portuguese explorer Duarte Pacheco Pereira, observed the Ijebu trading in cloths, beads, hide and palm oil in the direction of the Forcados in the central Niger-Delta, a practice that continued into the 20th century. A chief of the Itsekiri, a people with whom the Ijebu are culturally, linguistically and ancestrally related, recounted that as a child, he had seen Ijebus selling cloths along the river bank near his village of Batere. These traders were called the ' Abamira ' lit. help me to sell. The Portuguese exported these textiles to Brazil as trade items, there known as “pano da costa” (cloth from the coast), which were highly valued for their durability. The clothes were also traded and resold as far as the Gold Coast (now southern Ghana), Gabon and Angola via European middlemen in the same period.

Highly patterned Aso Olona cloth was traded eastwards and sold by long-distance Ijebu merchants, from at least the 1700's (18th century) to eastern Ijaw groups, namely; the Nembe, Bonny (Ibani) and Kalabari, where the cloths became prestige items known as the Ikaki-bite or Ikagibara (tortoise cloths), an interpretation of the various Ijebu designs amongst the new Ijaw users. They were highly valued for their beauty and intricate designs, and became the standard attire for kings in certain eastern Ijo communities, through the process of 'cultural authentication'.

The Ijaws remained conscious of the cloth's western origins. Among the Nembe Ijaw, the Owuaya masquerade can only be performed (brought out from the canoe) through the presentation of an extremely valued woven cloth bearing the 'tortoise design' called the 'Iselema bite', said to come from the Warri area, (Iselema being the Nembe word for the area). The construction and patterning of the Iselema cloth suggests strong Ijebu origins. Certain other Western Ijaw groups such as the Egbema refer to the same cloths as the 'Idoko bite', i.e Idoko cloth. Idoko is another name for the Ijebu Yoruba.

=== Introduction to Akwete and the Ndoki ===
In the 19th century, the Ndoki Igbo people of Akwete town and the surrounding area became heavily involved in the palm oil trade with the eastern Ijaws. Ndoki women, noting the importance to the Ijaws of the Yoruba cloths, incorporated wide looms, and began to weave cloths of similar patterns and motifs to replicate the elaborate attributes of the Yoruba textiles, to trade with the peoples of the delta.

The Ijaw end-users began to commission Akwete weavers to re-produce the designs, and gradually, supply from weavers from the closer region of Akwete to their new Ijaw clients superseded the supply from the Ijebu region, a situation that lasted into the present. At present, only a few of the Ijaw Ikakibite are ijebu originals, the vast majority being the versions of Akwete.

Today, Aso Olona continues to influence modern designers both in Nigeria and abroad.
