= Seghosen =

Yoruba hand-woven fabric from Owo

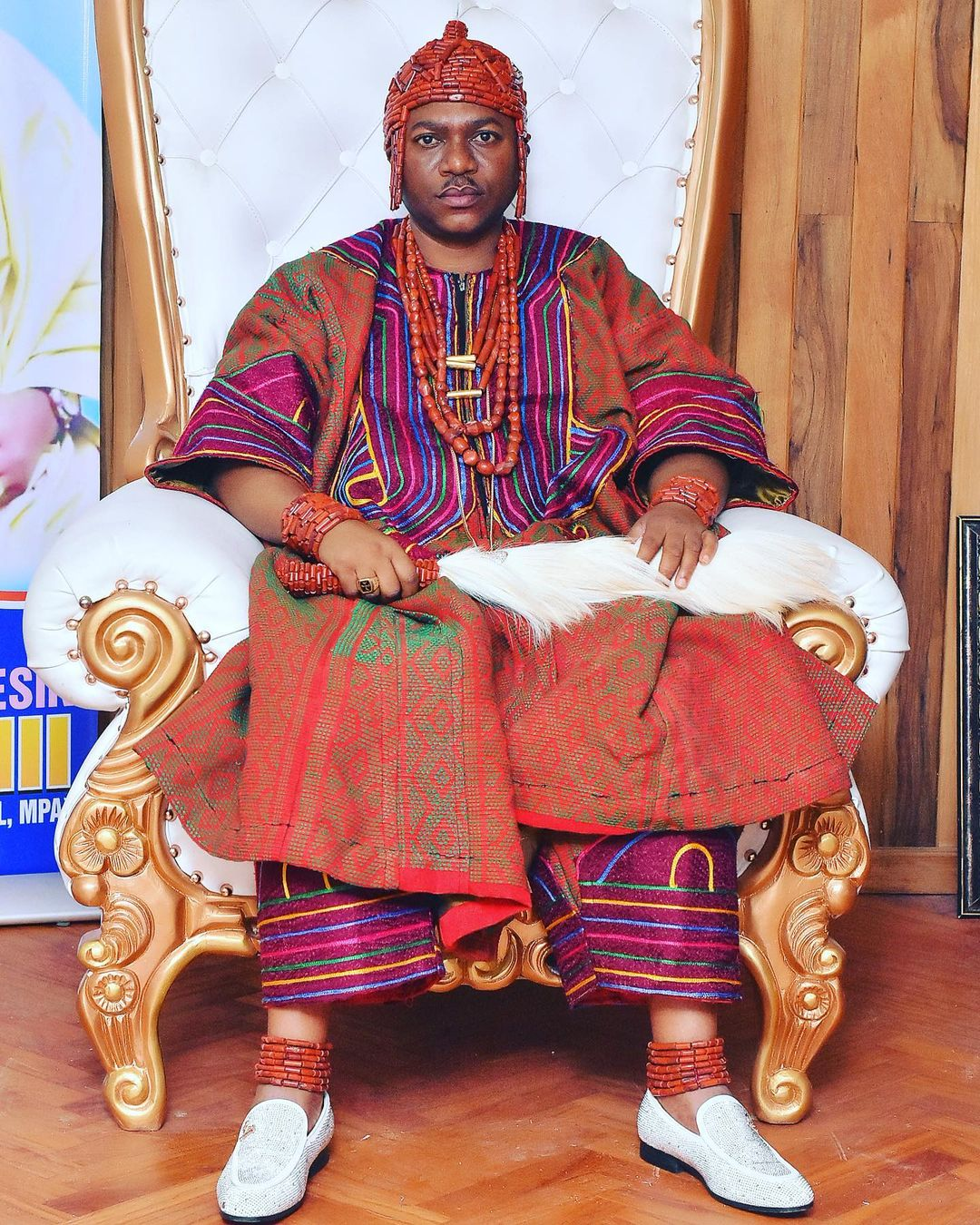
The Olowo of Owo in a decorated Seghosen robe

Seghosen, Senghosen or Sheghoshen lit. The cloth that takes all money, is a type of traditional Yoruba woven prestige cloth of the Owo people in Ondo state, woven over a wide or broad loom. Seghosen is characterized by its intricate pattern designs and is commonly of an orange, reddish, blueish or greenish color. It has also been modernized to include a wide range of other colors. Senghosen is sometimes worn in the pakaja fashion by the men. Other fabric unique to the Owo area include Igbero and Gege.

It is a highly valued cloth in the Owo Kingdom, and is the most expensive traditional cloth made in Owo. The Owo Yoruba believe that the design is quite old, and they generally interpret it as a symbol of wealth and affluence.

Seghosen, Shenghoshen fabric of Owo, Ondo State

Seghosen fabric is often used in the creation of various traditional Yoruba garments and accessories. The fabric's durability and beauty make it a popular choice for special occasions such as weddings, festivals, meeting with top politicians, and other significant cultural events. The weaving techniques employed in producing Seghosen fabric have been passed down through generations. In recent times, the use of seghosen has expanded/evolved into various niches such as in the making of various fashion accessories such as bags, shoes and even make up kits.

Nigerian fashion designer and entrepreneur Ayomitide Okungbaye of Tide Chen fashion house, has presented Senghosen as part of the Sengwa collection on fashion runways in Lagos and London, a material the London fashion industry had never encountered until then.
