= Agbada =

Yoruba ensemble of a robe, shirt, trousers, and fìla

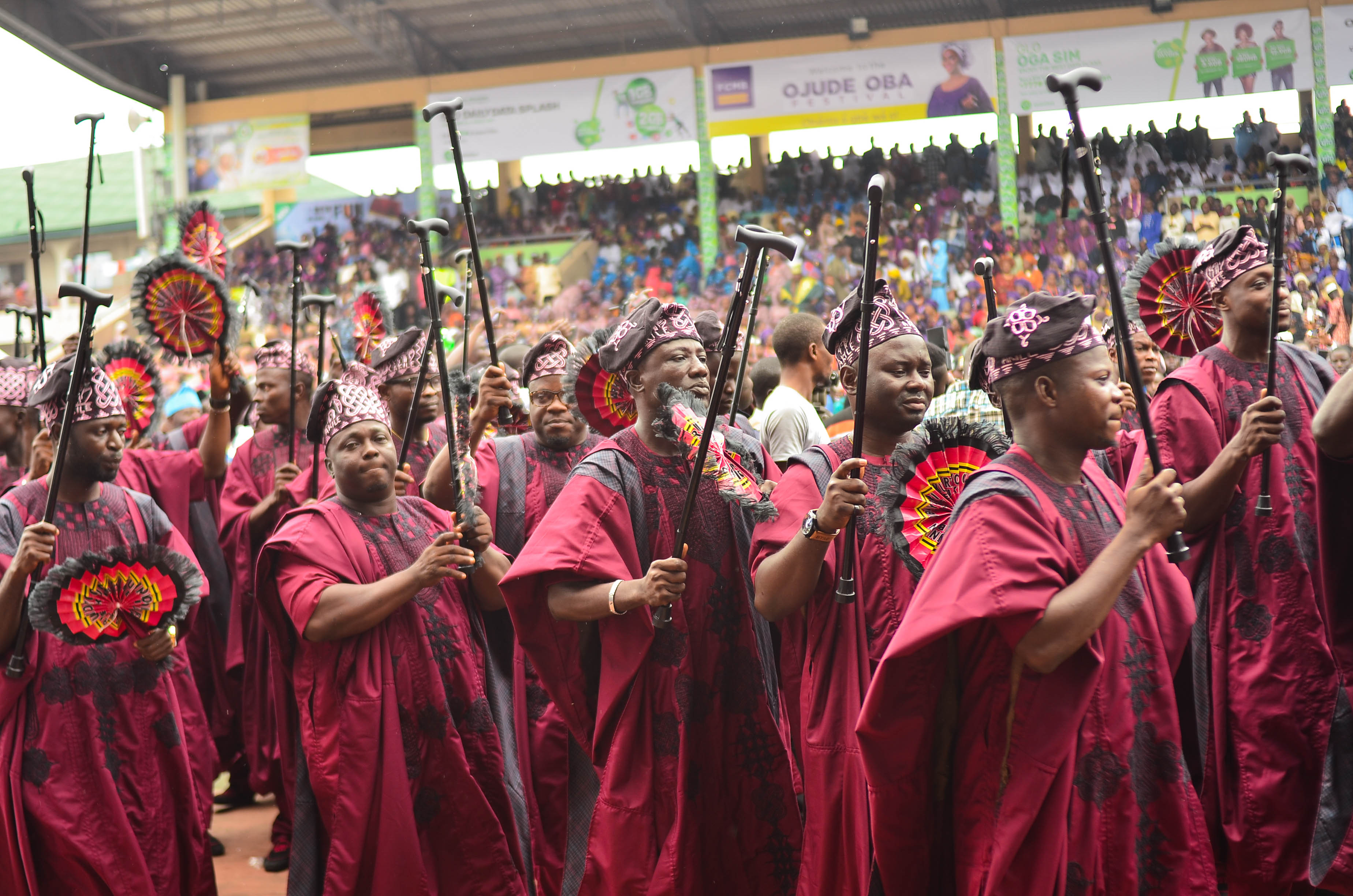
Yoruba men in Agbada during Ojude Oba festival

Agbada (Yoruba: Agbádá) lit.: Gown, Garment, Robe, is the flowing robe traditionally worn by the Yoruba people across West Africa. It comes with an innercloth of varying lengths, and it also comes with a pair of bottom wear in form of native trousers called Shokoto. It is also worn most times with different caps like Fila, Abeti Aja and so on. Traditional Yoruba beads are most time worn with it. It's a male attire worn for special events and everyday life, depending on the extravagance of the garment. It is a distinct robe that comes in different styles and designs.

== History ==
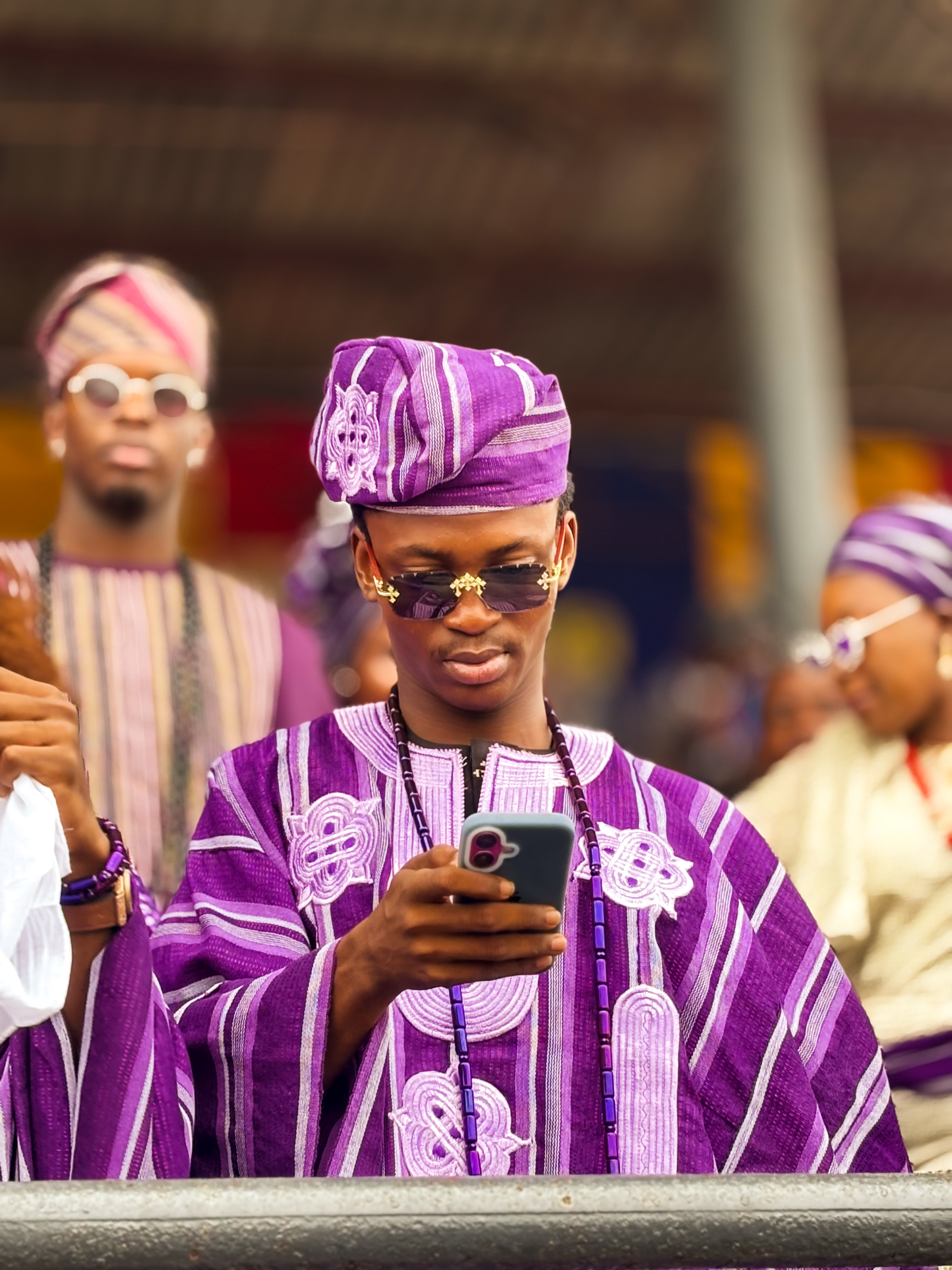
Yoruba man in Agbada

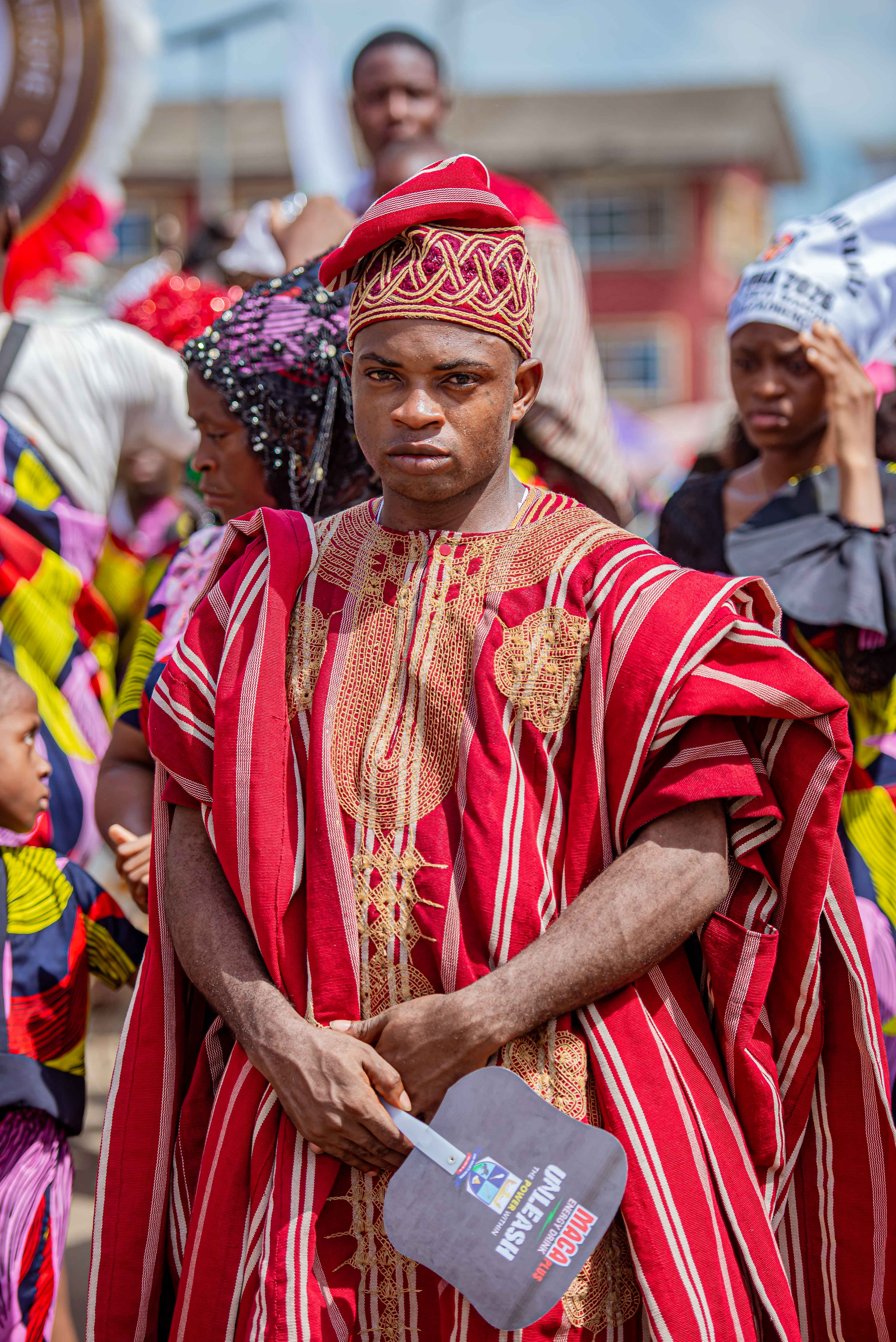
Agbada made of Òfì

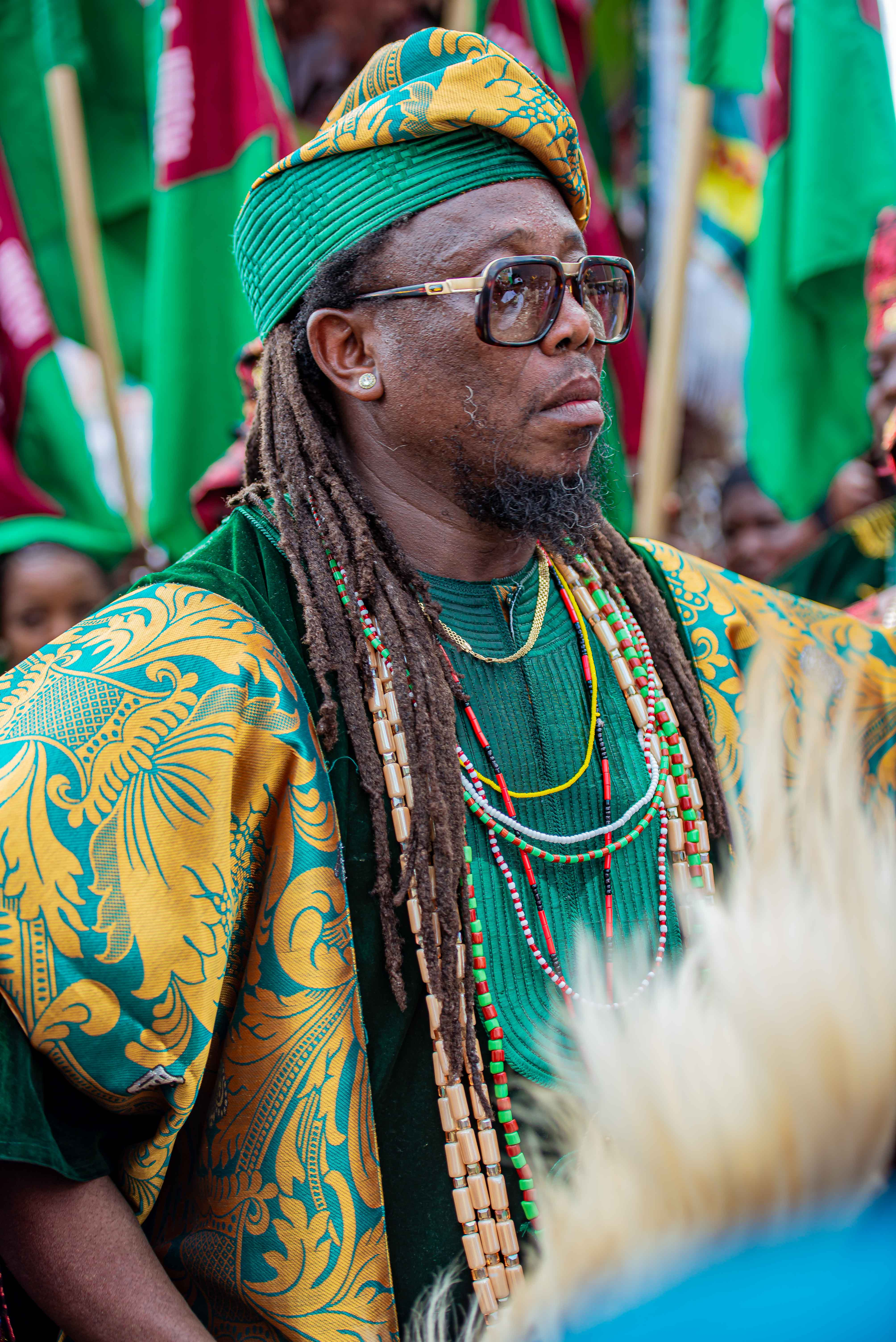
Agbada made of Damask

The Agbada (Yoruba men's prestige robe), is often associated with other flowing full body robes such as the Babban Riga (Hausa), and the Grand Boubou (Wolof). These garments are thought to have their origin among the nobility of 12th century west African empires, and they have been described as embroidered robes with both Islamic and non-Islamic influences.

It is not certain when the Agbada became distinct from other similar regional robes, or if it had its own native origin. Some theories propose that acculturation by non-Muslims modified these robes to fit more local tastes. Various groups have historically been recorded to wear robes that were primarily attributed to the Yoruba. As far back as 1864, Richard Francis Burton documented that Muslim men in Porto-Novo wore the:

"Guinea-fowl embroidered robe of the Yoruba".

Likewise, almost a century earlier in 1772, Robert Norris noted that:

"The vice-roy of Whydah, and the governors of the different towns and provinces, must be there with their presents also, and give an account of their conduct, and of every circumstance which the King wishes to be informed of. They who acquit themselves to his satisfaction, have the honor to receive some mark of his approbation; which is generally a large cotton cloth, manufactured in the Eyo (Note: Oyo is written as Ayot, Eyo, Ayaux, Ailleaux, Eyeo, and Aillot in manuscripts from the 17th-19th century.) country, of excellent workmanship, which they afterwards wear for an upper garment"

The Agbada has been a native symbol of status for the Yoruba for centuries, and a significant contributor to the global image of West African fashion at large.

== Design ==
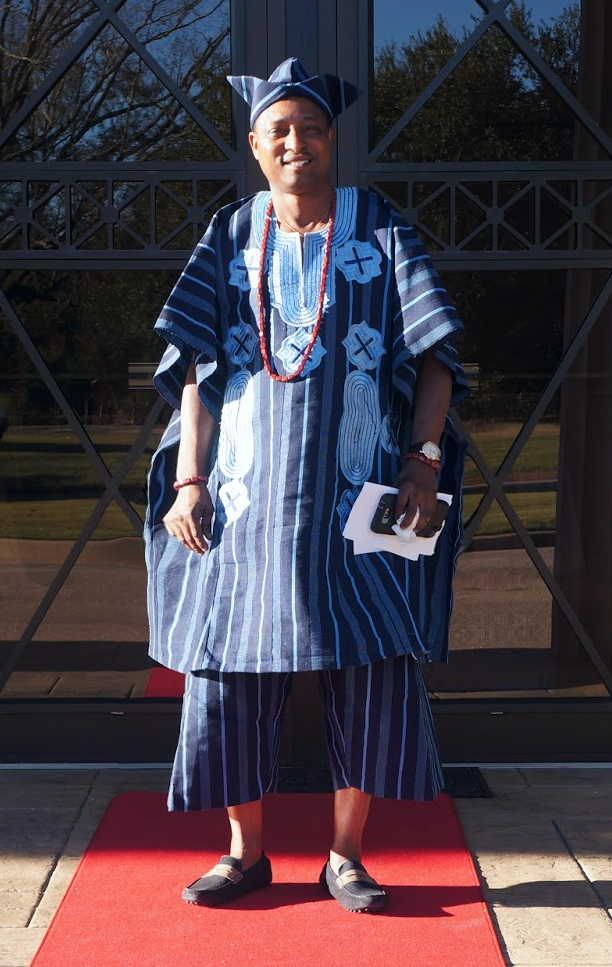
Man wearing a Gbariye

A common feature of the Traditional Agbada is the two embroidered pockets for resting your hands at the center of the garment, this feature of clothing is present in the Yoruba Gbariye, a shorter sleeved variant. The neckline's embroidery can give the impression of a lacey necklace, some flow along the neck and down to the center of the chest in accretive rings. One particular style of Aso-oke used for the Agbada is known as "Etu", reportedly made to reflect the light and dark striped pattern of the Guinea Fowl after which it is named.

Many Agbada are made with Aso-oke (Aso ofi) fabric but can be made in many other different fabrics of local and imported sources, including Adire, Brocade, Damask, and Laces. Agbada are detailed with different styles, shapes, and colours.

Agbada usually features native Yoruba embroidery, alongside symbolic motifs such as the Grand knot native to the Yoruba Culture. Agbada is one of the Attires of Yoruba men, others include Gbariye, Sulia, Oyala, Kembe, etc.
