= Fila (hat) =

Traditional Yoruba hat

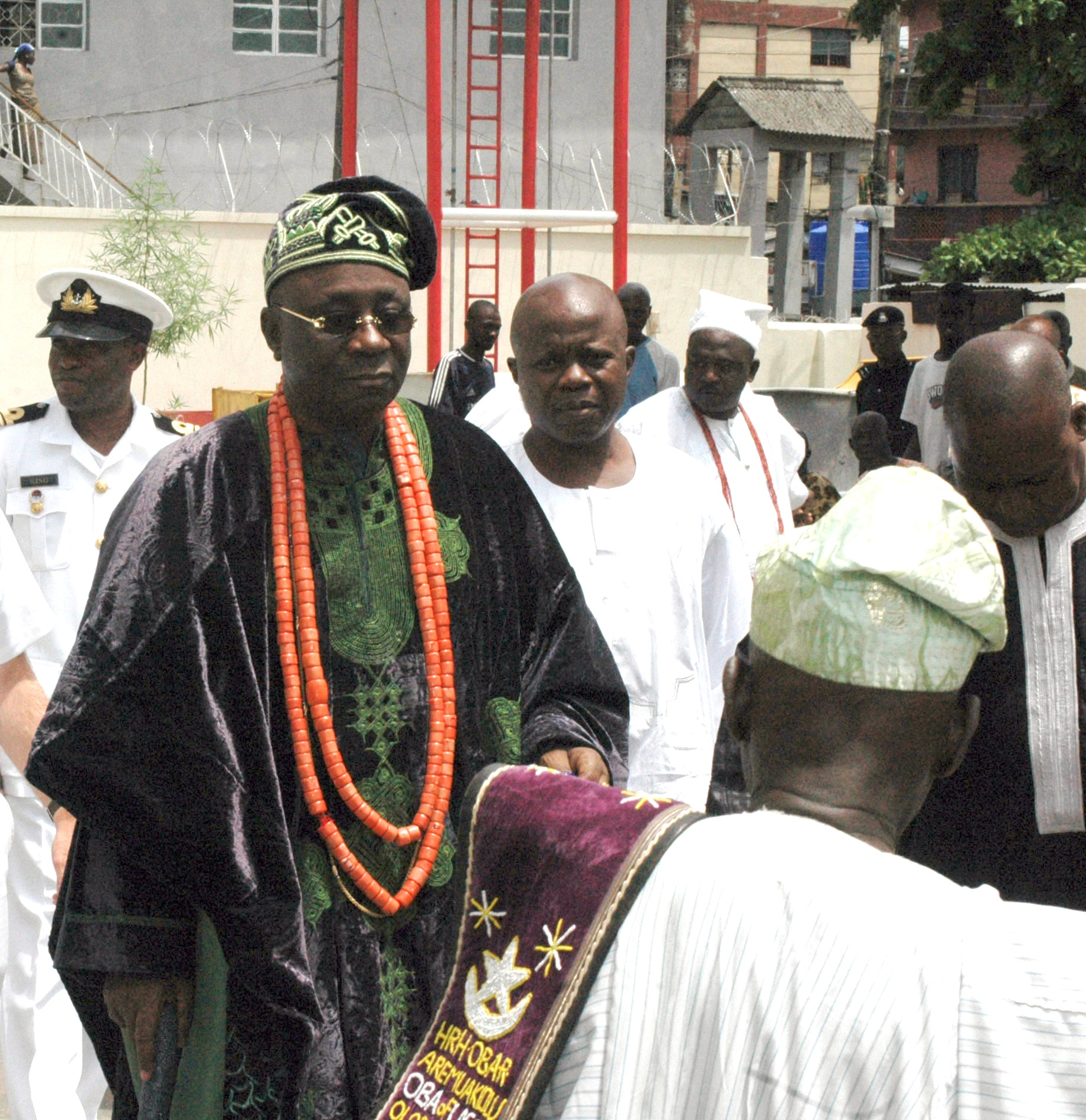
The Oba (King) of Lagos wearing a Fila Gobi

A fila (fìlà; Yoruba pronunciation: [/fì.là/], lit. 'hat') is a soft hat traditionally worn by the Yoruba people of Western Africa. It is made of hand-woven aso oke fabric, cotton, velvet, or damask. They are usually lined with cotton, but can be unlined if crafted to be worn for a single event.

Although these hats originated amongst the Yoruba in Yorubaland they are worn by men of other African ethnicities and of African descent. Worn exclusively by men, the fila fits snugly around the head, and it is commonly worn pushed to one side, resting above the wearer's ear. However, it can be "shaped" in a variety of ways, according to the personal taste of the wearer. It is said by some that fila gobi when worn to the right (right -hand) signifies an unmarried man, while wearing it to the left (left-hand) indicates a married man, but there are different reasons. When a king or people of higher cadre wears it in one direction during an encounter, his followers wear it in the other. The younger ones tilt theirs to the front meaning that the future is theirs and elderly tilt theirs to the back meaning that they have had their time. A similar tradition exists in Bavaria with the knot of the Dirndl.

It is commonly worn with Yoruba casual attire and required wearing when dressing formally in an Agbada (also made with aso oke, lace or cotton) or brocade dashiki suits.

== History ==
Per tailor, Adeyemi Olatunde Kehinde, the making of fila was once sacred labor, indicating that the "forefathers" didn't use machines and "every stitch was done by hand.” Kehinde emphasized that making the fila is an art of precision without shortcuts.

=== Modern ===
In recent years, the fila has found new life through the works of modern designers and brands. Also, a notable instance of a fila being worn recently, and for a special occasion, was actor John Boyega wearing one to the Star Wars: The Rise of Skywalker premiere.

Modern manufacturing uses tools like Tinko and Phoenix machines.

== Types ==
The two Fila Onide Yoruba cap types on mannequin models

Yoruba ceremonial male dressing is usually considered 'incomplete' without a hat (cap) or head-gear. There are two major classes. These are: the cylindrically shaped caps called Ikori, and the 'dog-eared' varieties called 'Labankada'. They come in varied shapes, and include;

- Gobi or Origi — A cylindrical cap made of flexible material, featuring a dropped side that can be styled in multiple directions. It may be heavily embroidered stiff on the round head opening. It is the most common fila today.
- Adiro — A cap with a considerably longer bulbous slouch that reaches to around the shoulder. It is also called 'Fila olode', and well used by hunters in the past. It is the longest in the Ikori family.
- Fila onide — A velvet cap whose name translates as 'cap of brass' (idẹ). It is of two types; flat top and foldable / droopy top. It features large and intricately braided golden/yellow/brass and/or silver thread-work on the top and around (hence its name), and sometimes, a hanging tassel (winjin winjin). It is sometimes called 'Fila Asinde' or 'Fila Ide'.
- Abeti Aja — A cap styled with two "handles" that resemble dog ears, which may be droopy or upright. It is made from different fabrics including Aso oke and Damask.. They are also knon generally as Labankada, or Yoti.
- Akete — A wide brimmed hat similar to a Sombrero, popular in places like Ondo, Ife, Egba and Lagos. It is also called Ege.
- Other caps include; Bentigo and Alabo (the type chief Obafemi Awolowo made popular.

== Textiles ==
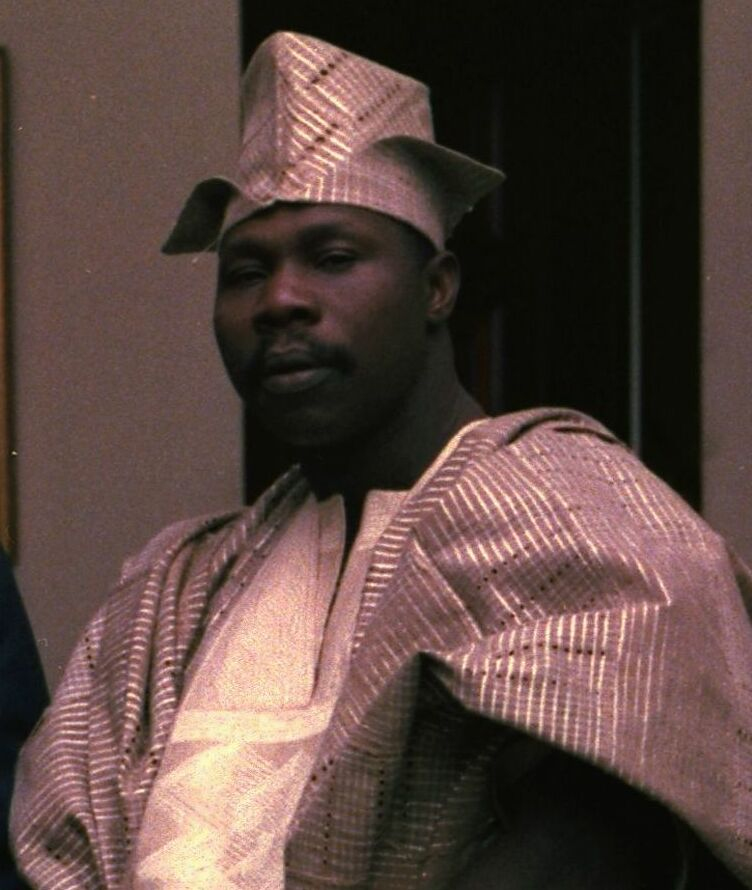
Fila Abeti Aja

=== Motifs ===
The tilt of the fila carries unspoken meanings:

- forward for the ambitious
- left for the married
- right for the single
- raised for the seekers
- back for the elders watching the next generation rise

== See also ==
- Fila onide
- Agbada
- Dashiki
- Kufi
- Senegalese kaftan
- Yoruba people
