= Adoption of Yoruba Traditional Clothing by Non-Yoruba Nigerians =

Yoruba clothing adoption by non Yoruba in Nigeria

Adoption of Yoruba clothing in Nigeria refers to the widespread use of clothing and dress practices associated with the Yoruba people by other ethnic groups in Nigeria. Several Yoruba-associated garments and social practices have become part of the country's wider fashion culture, particularly in ceremonies and celebrations. Examples of this are the adoption of Gele and Asoebi fashions by non Yorubas. The Gele has come to be viewed as the national headdress of Nigeria.

Ezeagu Igbo Bride wearing a Gele

== Adoption among non-Yorubas in Nigeria ==
Bride from Akwa Ibom wearing a Gele

From the history and pre history of Nigeria, many ethnicities had different modes of dresses. Some cultures were noted to be fully clothed according to what was considered such by Western standards, like the Yorubas.Some certain cultures were described as scantily clad or considered nude in the eyes and customs of colonial ethnographers, like the Igbos. Cultures in either categories developed their own modes of dress at different point in history. Today however, the popularity of Yoruba clothing overrides and collapses with certain cultures dress styles.

The adoption of Yoruba clothing was a way to show prestige. Ottenberg, a researcher on the Igbo culture notes the adoption of Yoruba-style of dressing including the eleborate Gele headdress adopted by the Igbo to show prestige. In the Nigerian Geographical Journal, the People of Eastern Nigeria, Barry Floyd also notes that many Easterners (Igbos) wear a "Nigerian dress" which is Hausa or Yoruba in origin but had become popular as national costume. In 1944, Anthropologist Sylvia Leith-Ross recorded the contact of Gele among the Igbos and the dislike yet adoption of it by some women.

Nigerians are noted to have adopted the Yoruba dressing style as a kind of national dress. Walter Schwarz notes :

Igbo woman wearing a Gele

"Nigerian women have adapted traditional styles with considerable ingenuity. Most distinctive are the Yoruba, whose rich robes, often hand-dyed in indigo and finely patterned, and tall head-ties make a group of them look like birds of paradise."

Aso ebi, a practice involving the wearing of coordinated clothing by relatives, friends and other guests at social occasions, is another example of a commonly adopted Yoruba culture fashion staple. Originally confined within the Yoruba society, the practice has become common among other ethnic groups in Nigeria and some other parts of Africa.

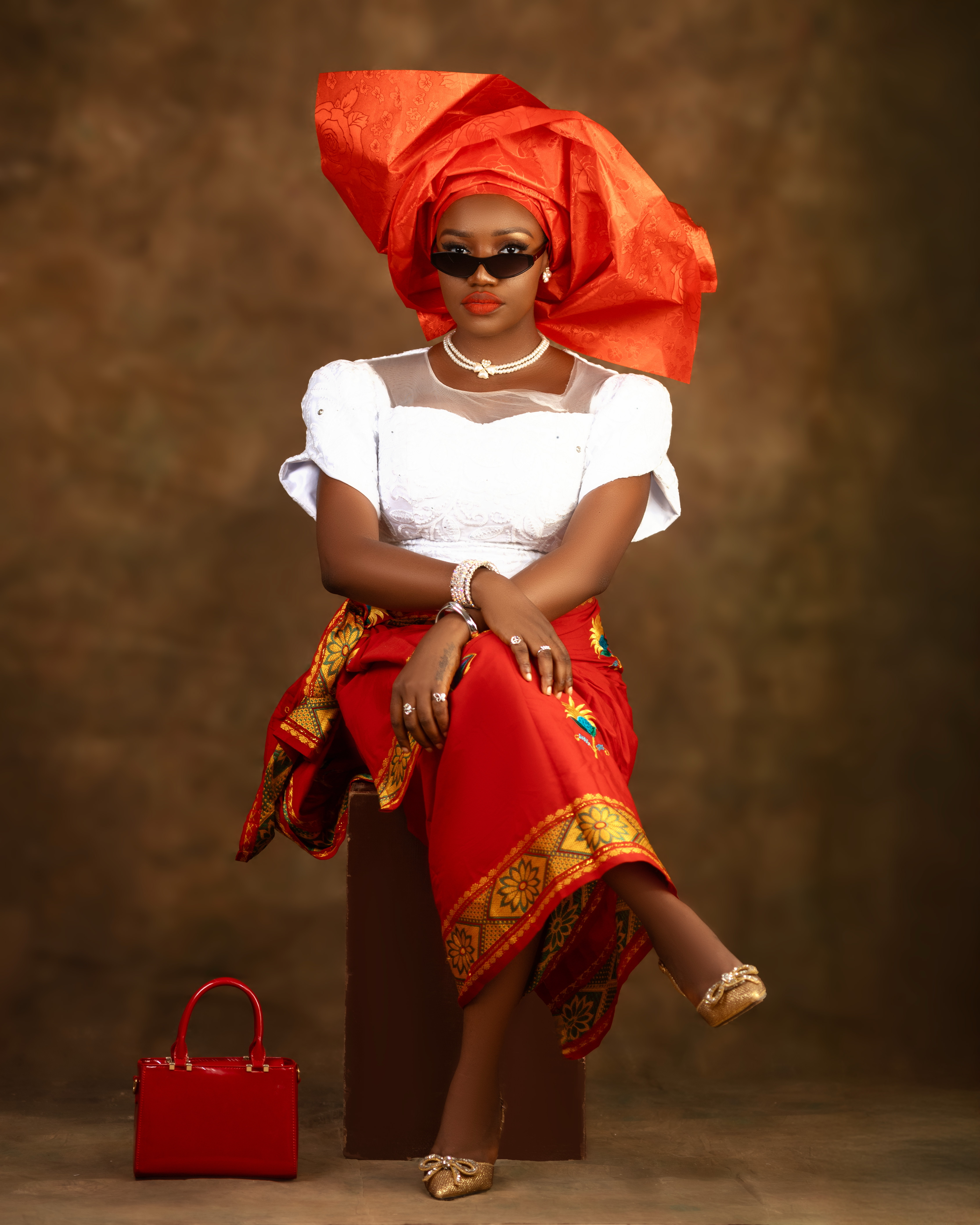
Igbo woman wearing a Gele

Gele, a traditional headdress of Yoruba women has also been adopted for events by Igbo women. Research documents the growing use of Gele and the ready-made version called Auto-Gele by other non Yoruba ethnicities like the Igbo. Nicholas Freville in " Nigeria" also makes a comparative analysis with pictures of Igbo women and girls in headscarves where he observed that they were notably simpler than the turban-like Gele, whose height made Yoruba women recognisable at a distance.

During colonialism and post, Igbo women who wore a head covering, wore a bandana-like headtie, referred to as Ichafo or Ichafu. This is synonymous to iborun or ibori in Yoruba, a scarf cloth. Sam Olden’s "Getting to Know Nigeria" (1965) describes the gele as an “enormous headdress,” twisted and tucked into shape until its ends stand out “like small sails.” Igbo womens headtie as “bright knotted scarves”, a clear distinction.

Nicholas Freville, distinguishes the Yoruba headties describing it as distinctive enough to identify a woman from a distance, the Igbo headties or Ichafu was “much simpler than the Yoruba turbans.” The pictures showed of Igbo women was of simple scarfs. Ichafo or Ichafu was compared to a bandana, tallying with other academic work on head covering among Igbo women. Gele wearing replaced the wearing of simiple scarfs for most upscale events among many Igbos, though Igbo women still wear Ichafu or simple headties to events as well.

Uchendu describes the adoption of Yoruba women's attire by Anioma women in Lagos.

Anselm Uba in Cultural Influence on Selective Attention Processes notes that the Igbo did not develop a distinct cultural dress and notes that the concept of traditional dressing among the Igbo was considered as primitive.

Fashion designer Ubby Iffy talks about Igbo adoption of Yoruba cultural garb like Gele and also Iro ati Buba, asides from asoebi as well:

A traditional Igbo woman usually wears a blouse and two wrapping cloths – usually a matching skirt and a gele. This clothing choice is a clear indicator of where she comes from. Unlike other ethnic groups who prefer Ankara fabric, Igbo women typically opt for lace materials. They also tend to skip the double wrappers and go for a style called ‘Buba and Iro’ (the literal translation is “the act of wrapping”). This unique style makes it easy to recognise an Igbo woman.”

The hausa document the introduction of Gele in hausaland by a family of Yoruba trader.

Contemporary fashion

Hausa Bride wears an Auto-Gele

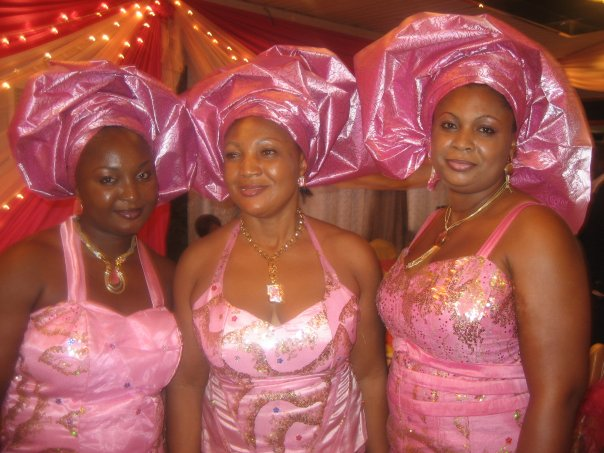
Igbo women at a wedding in Nnewi in Gele and Asoebi

Yoruba clothing has also influenced beyond the regions of Yorubaland in Nigeria, Togo and Benin, non Yoruba regions in those countries and Africa, but also pop up among celebrations in other parts of Africa and the world.
