= Aso ebi =

Yoruba dressing style

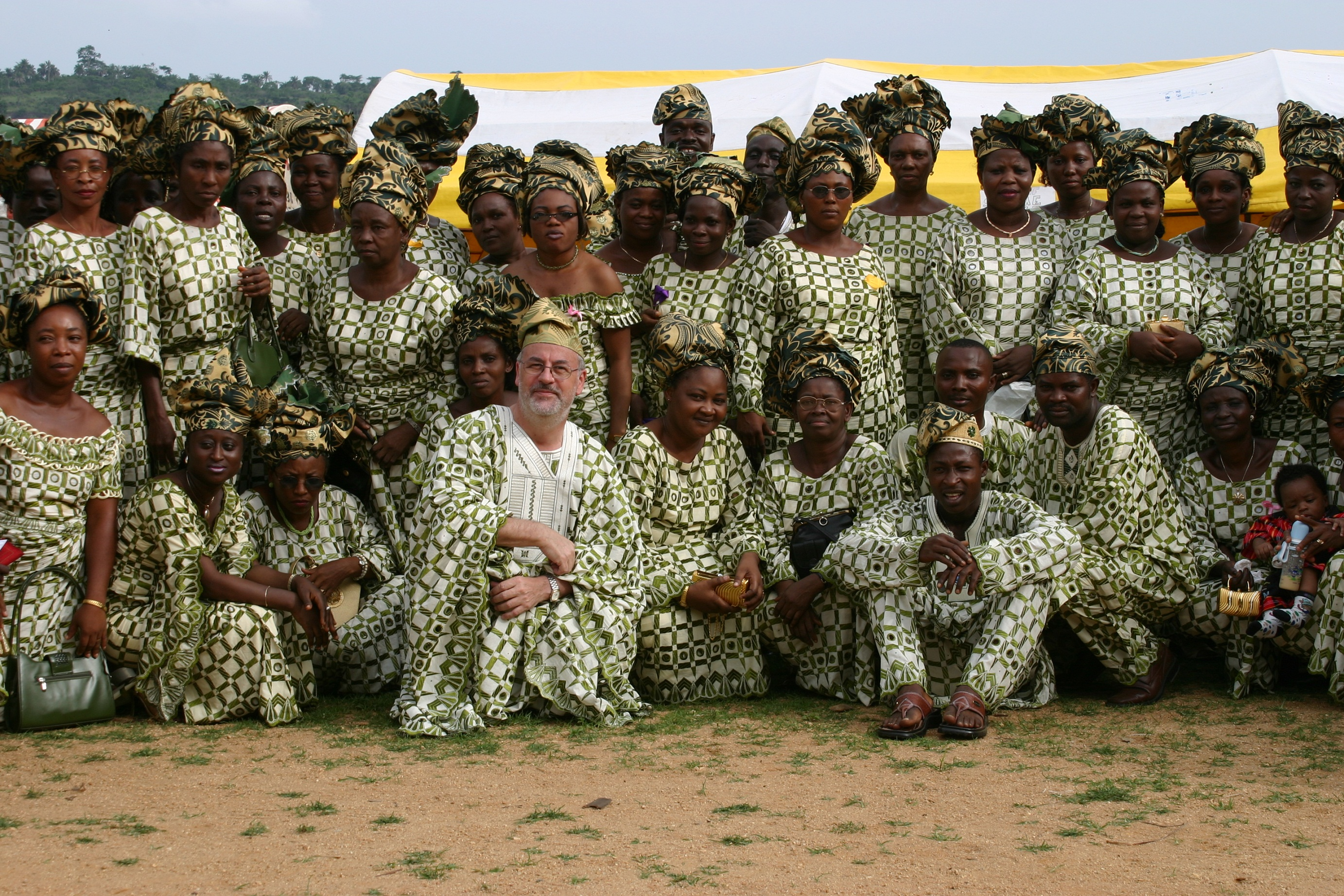
Yoruba people in Asọ-Ẹbí (Nigeria)

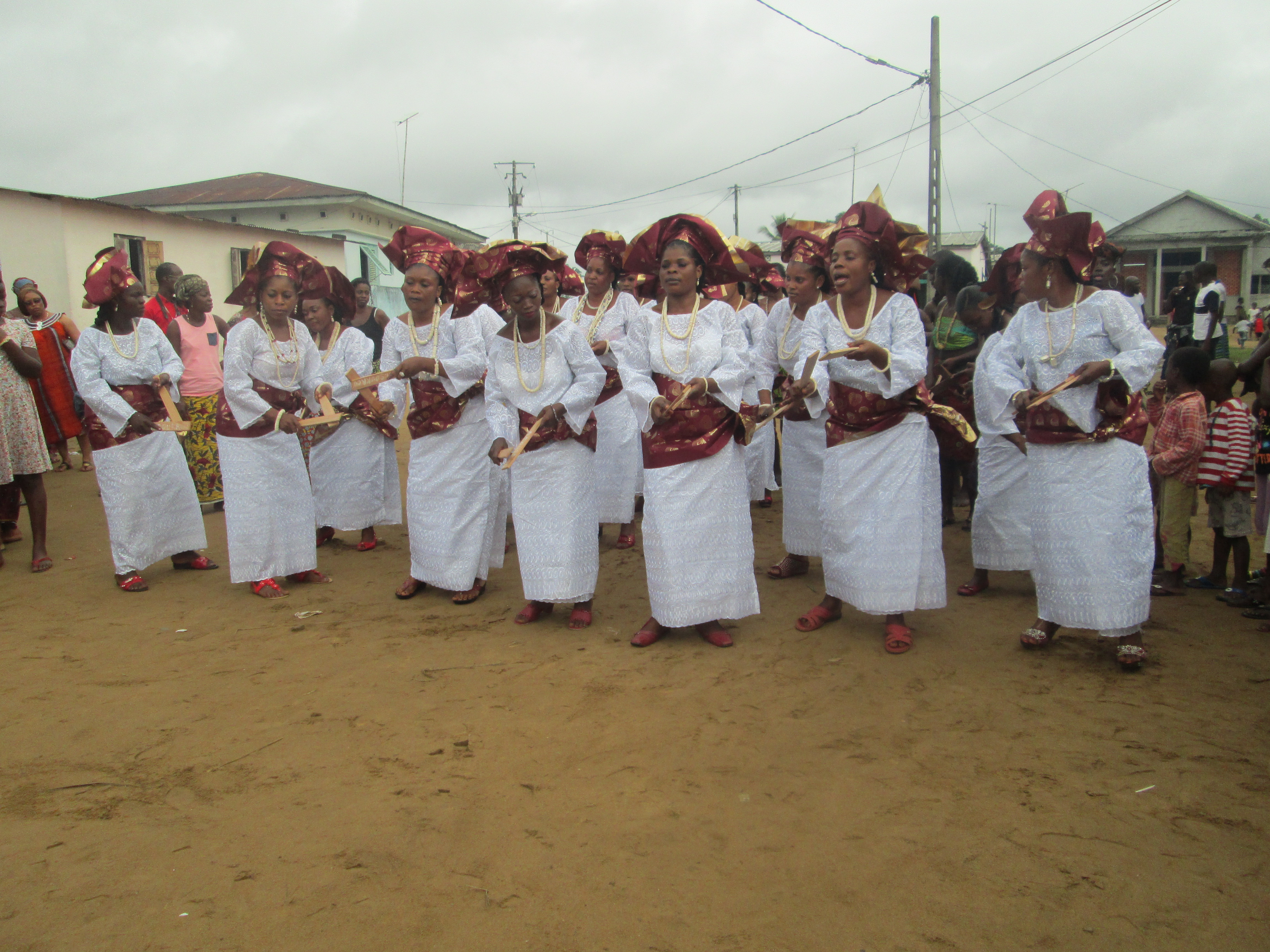
Yoruba women in Asọ-Ẹbí (Nigeria)

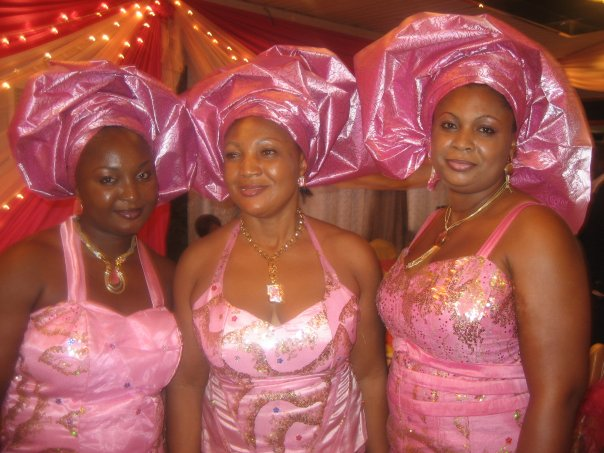
Asoebi style

Aso Ebi lit. Yoruba: 'family cloth', sometimes spelt as Asoebi in Nigeria, is a uniform dress or dressing code/style that is traditionally worn by the Yoruba People. It is an indicator of cooperation, camaraderie and solidarity during ceremonies, events and festive periods. The purpose of wearing the dress can be to serve as self-identification with age mates, relatives or friends during social occasions or funerals.

== Concept ==
Aso Ebi as a concept was born out of the Yoruba principle of Alajobi (filial bond or kinship). It is a matching wear that is worn to events by family members and friends, including men, women and children. It is the belief of the Yoruba that when friendship exceeds a certain threshold of support, then such friends are seen or regarded as ‘family’. This is exemplified by the saying; Ore bi omo iya, meaning; 'A friend like maternal kindred'.

It is also worn by members of what are essentially social clubs or age-grade sets, where they are also called 'Aso Egbejoda' i.e group uniform. In the context of weddings, it is a series of stylish dresses worn by the bride's friends, groom's friends, bridesmaids, groomsmen, the bride and groom's families, and wedding guests to the event. For the women, it may include elements of the komole style.

== Origins ==
The word Aṣo in Yoruba means cloth and Ẹbí denotes family group. Asọ-Ẹbí can be described as a family dress code usually worn in uniforms during family ceremonies such as weddings, funerals, birthdays and anniversaries. The practice has now spread beyond family dressing because well-wishers of a celebrant can wear the Asọ-Ẹbí.

Ayodele Olukoju, a Nigerian economic historian, believes Asọ-Ẹbí became a novelty in 1920 during a period of post–World War I economic boom triggered by the higher prices for products such as oil palm. William Bascom traced the origin to an earlier period when members of Yoruba age grade wore uniform dress to mark fraternal bonds. In the 1950s, members of women's organizations or egbes turned out to ceremonies and anniversaries of relatives in the same style of dress, sandals, lappa, smock, or necklace; the culture signifies close friendship. The uniform dressing can also be a measure of personal affluence because aso ebi involves rivalry between various egbes or groups with each group competing to outshine each other in terms of quality, originality and richness of the uniform.

== 1960s and beyond ==
From the mid-1960s to the late 1970s, imported lace and george were incorporated into Nigerian fabrics and they became popular items used for aso ebi. Increased demand for handcrafted traditional dresses such as agbada led to a resurgence of tailors and fashion designers specializing in making native attires. The tailors strived to meet the increasing demand and designs of uniform dressing, sometimes with the aid of the fashion pages of magazines to make style choices. The rise of aso ebi also coincided with an intense market of fashion and lifestyle magazines in Lagos; tailors look at designs for inspiration and their patrons buy the magazines to see whether they or their friends are pictured in them. Okechukwu Nwafor has shown Lagos cosmopolitanism in asoebi usage whereby its fashioning is largely tied to a dialogue between photographers, fashion magazines, vendors, and tailors in urban Lagos. In recent times, the extent of social expansiveness that has befallen aso ebi is such that both a stranger and an uninvited guest might seek recognition through aso ebi. The increasing eagerness of guests to don aso ebi stems from the special recognition bestowed upon those who do.

Aso ebi in recent times has become a city phenomenon that has spread to other West African cultures. For example, in Sierra Leone and Cameroon aso ebi is rephrased as Ashobi with many participants unaware of its Yoruba origins. Dealers of imported and local textile materials have benefited from the boom in demand for uniform dressing. Some textile dealers offer consultation services and bulk rates for the choice and cost of the dress and fabrics. While the price of fabrics in sewing the traditional attire is affordable, the aso ebi practice is still sometimes used as an identification with affluence. Some wear expensive embroidery and extra layers of cloth, whereas others, who cannot afford a whole outfit, add only matching tops and head coverings. Aso ebi has become an attire of class worn by celebrities and elites in recent times, especially Nigerian Nollywood stars. With fashion designers creatively making outfits for special occasions to meet the taste of their wealthy customers, aso ebi outfits have become a regular occurrence today.
