= LEIMAY =

American multi-disciplinary arts organization

LEIMAY, officially the LEIMAY Foundation and Ensemble, is a multi-disciplinary arts organization composed of co-founders and Artistic Directors Ximena Garnica and Shige Moriya.

Among their most notable works are Becoming-Corpus, which debuted at the Brooklyn Academy of Music in 2013 and CORRESPONDENCES.
