= Taptuk Emre =

Mystic of Anatolia and mentor of popular folk poet Yunus Emre

Tapduk Emre
- تابدوك امره

Personal life
- Born: 1210-1215
- Died: Unknown
- Era: Anatolian beyliks
- Known for: Guide of Yunus Emre, the popular folk poet of Anatolia

Religious life
- Religion: Islam

Muslim leader
- Period in office: 13th century
- Influenced by: Barak Baba, Haji Bektash Veli
- Influenced: Yunus Emre

Taptuk Emre (b. 1210-1215 - d. ?), a Turkmen mystic and Sufi shaykh from amongst the Khorasani saints, and the mentor/murshid of Yunus Emre. He was from Khorasan and came to Anatolia during the reign of Genghis Khan to spread the Bektashi style of the Qur'an and the Ahl al-Bayt creed, that is, the belief in Muhammad and the Twelve Imams. He is thought to have been born between 1210 and 1215. Many sources point out that he was a Babai-Haydari dervish. He is the successor of Barak Baba, but Bektashis claim he was the successor of Haji Bektash Veli. It is said that Hacı Bektaş-ı Veli left the job of raising Yunus Emre to Taptuk Emre. Starting with Tapduk Emre, the existence of a community of followers of Tapduk has been encountered in Anatolia. Dervish Yunus, who carried wood to Taptuk Emre's dergah in Nallıhan for forty years, is regarded as one of the greatest bards/poets raised by the ascetics of Anatolia.

Although the exact location of Tapduk Emre's grave has not been determined, there are tombs claimed to belong to Tapduk Emre in Eskişehir, Nevşehir (Hacıbektaş district), Manisa, Aksaray and Afyonkarahisar.

== Meaning of the name ==
The word Tapduk is a name that also existed in pre-Islamic Turkish communities. Tapduk is a mythical hero in Turkish and Altai mythology. It is also called Tapdik (Taptik, Taptuk). He is the legendary hero who is believed to have descended from the sky to cleanse the evil beings. According to many opinions, it is possible that the name of Tapduk Emre, who was the sheikh of Yunus Emre, comes from here. In fact, some researchers arguee that Tapduk Emre is not a historical personality, but that this ancient legendary hero was adapted to Yunus Emre's life story by folk culture and social memory. According to Celal Beydili, the meaning of the name Tapduk means "found by chance" (the Azeri word "to worship" means to find), and it is related to the motif of a child found by a Divine power. It is accepted that the word Emre is related to the concept of İmre. Amramak/Emremek/Imremek means “falling in love” and the word Emre means “lover of God“.

== Popular culture ==
Tapduk Emre was played by Payidar Tüfekçioğlu in the 2015-2016 Turkish TV series Yunus Emre: Aşkın Yolculuğu (Yunus Emre: The Path of Love).
