= Yunus Emre =

Turkish Sufi and folk poet (1238–1320)

Yûnus Emre
- يونس امره
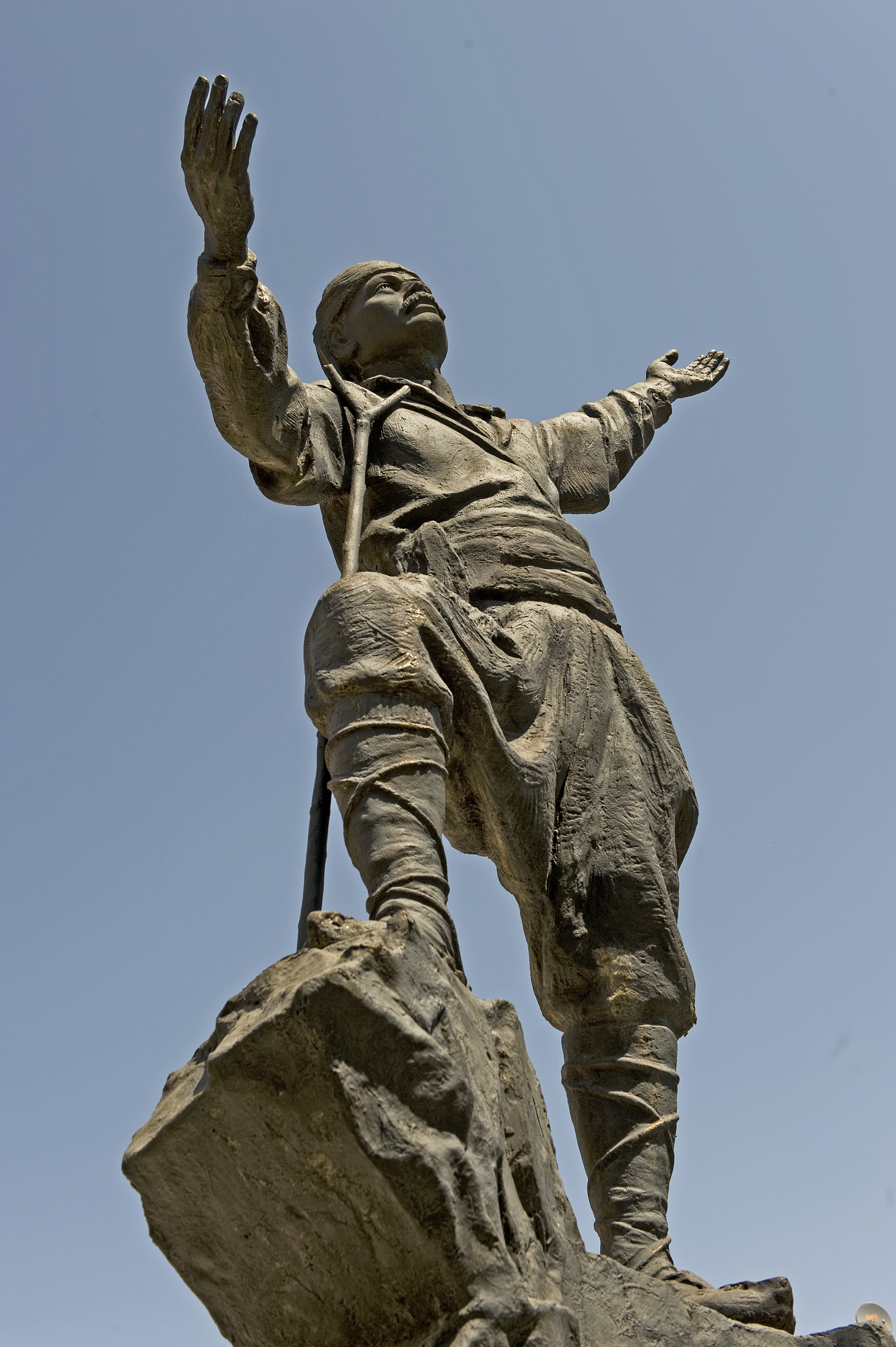
- Statue of Yûnus Emre in Karaman, Turkey

Personal life
- Born: 1238 Sarıköy near Sivrihisar, Sultanate of Rum, now Turkey
- Died: 1320 (aged 81–82) Yunusemre (formerly Saru), Ottoman Beylik, now Turkey
- Era: 13th–14th centuries
- Known for: Sufism, Diwan in Old Anatolian Turkish

Religious life
- Religion: Islam

Muslim leader
- Period in office: 13th and 14th century
- Influenced by: Tapduk Emre, Rumi, Ahmed Yesevi, Haji Bektash Veli, Ahi Evren, Sarı Saltık

Yunus Emre (Turkish pronunciation: [juːˈnus emˈɾe]), also known as Derviş Yûnus (Yûnus the Dervish; 1238–1320; Old Anatolian Turkish: يونس امره), was a Turkish folk poet and Sufi who greatly influenced Turkish culture. The UNESCO General Conference unanimously passed a resolution declaring 1991, the 750th anniversary of the poet's birth, International Yunus Emre Year.

== Biography ==
Yunus Emre has exercised immense influence on Turkish literature, because Yunus Emre is, after Ahmed Yesevi and Sultan Walad, one of the first known poets to have composed works in the spoken Old Anatolian Turkish. His diction remains very close to the popular speech of the people in Central and Western Anatolia. This is also the language of a number of anonymous folk-poets, folk-songs, fairy tales, riddles (Hayran), and proverbs.

Like the Oghuz Book of Dede Korkut, an older and anonymous Central Asian epic that inspired Yunus Emre in his occasional use of Hayran as a poetic device had been handed down orally to him and his contemporaries. This strictly oral tradition continued for a long while. Following the Mongolian invasion of Anatolia, facilitated by the Sultanate of Rûm's defeat at the 1243 Battle of Köse Dağ, Islamic mystic literature thrived in Anatolia; Yunus Emre became one of its most distinguished poets. He remains a popular figure in a number of countries, stretching from Azerbaijan to the Balkans, with seven different and widely dispersed localities disputing the privilege of having his tomb within their boundaries.

His poems, written in the tradition of Anatolian folk poetry, mainly concern divine love as well as human destiny:

Yunus'dur benim adım
Gün geçtikçe artar odum
İki cihanda maksûdum
Bana seni gerek seni.

Translation:

My name is Yunus,
Each passing day fans and rouses my flame,
What I desire in both worlds is the same:
You're the One I need, You're the One I crave.

and a poem about Muhammad, Ali, Hasan and Husayn:

Araya araya bulsam izini
İzinin tozuna sürsem yüzümü
Hak nasip eylese, görsem yüzünü
Ya Muhammed canım arzular seni

Bir mübarek sefer olsa da gitsem
Kâbe yollarında kumlara batsam
Mâh cemalin bir kez düşte seyretsem
Ya Muhammed canım pek sever seni

Ali ile Hasan-Hüseyin anda
Sevgisi gönülde, muhabbet canda
Yarın mahşer günü hak divanında
Ya Muhammed canım pek sever seni

"Yunus" senin medhin eder dillerde
Dillerde, dillerde, hem gönüllerde
Arayı arayı gurbet illerde
Ya Muhammed canım arzular seni

Translation:

By constantly searching, I would find the trace of you
I would rub my face in the dust of your trace
If God would grant me, I would see your face
O Muhammad, my soul desires you

If there was a blessed journey I would go
Sink in the sand on the way to the Kaaba I would
Watch your beauty once in a dream I would
O Muhammad, my soul loves you so

Ali, and Hasan and Husayn at the same time
Their love is in the heart, fondness in the soul
On the Day of Resurrection, in the Court of the Truth tomorrow
O Muhammad, my soul loves you so

"Yunus" praises you on tongues
On tongues, on tongues, and also in hearts
By constantly searching in foreign parts
O Muhammad, my soul desires you

== In popular culture ==
Yunus Emre was the focus of Yunus Emre: Aşkın Yolculuğu (The Journey of Love), which ran for two seasons and 44 episodes, focused on Yunus Emre's life and premiered in 2015 on Turkish National Television (TRT), created by Mehmet Bozdağ, and starring Gökhan Atalay as Yunus Emre. Yunus Emre has also been the focus of a film and a song; his representations in popular culture include:

- Yunus Emre: Aşkın Yolculuğu – A two-season 44-episode fictional drama based on the life of Yunus Emre, premiering in 2015 on Turkish National Television (TRT).
- Yunus Emre: Aşkın Sesi – A 2014 Turkish film based on Yunus Emre's life starring Devrim Evin in the lead role.
- Adımız Miskindir Bizim – A 1973 psychedelic folk-rock song by Mazhar ve Fuat, with lyrics belongs to Yunus Emre.
- Yûnus Emre Divânı 1 – A 2021 album based on four poems: Şükür Şükür Ol Çalab'a, Hak'dan Gelen Şerbeti, Cânlar Cânını Buldum and Biz Dünyadan Gider Olduk by Yunus Emre was produced by the group An'dan İçeri, with music from Turkish composer Tuncay Korkmaz.

== International legacy ==
In Ashgabat (Turkmenistan), a street was named after Yunus Emre and three monuments were erected (in the Parahat-1 microdistrict, in the Inspiration Park and in the Magtymguly Park).

== Gallery ==
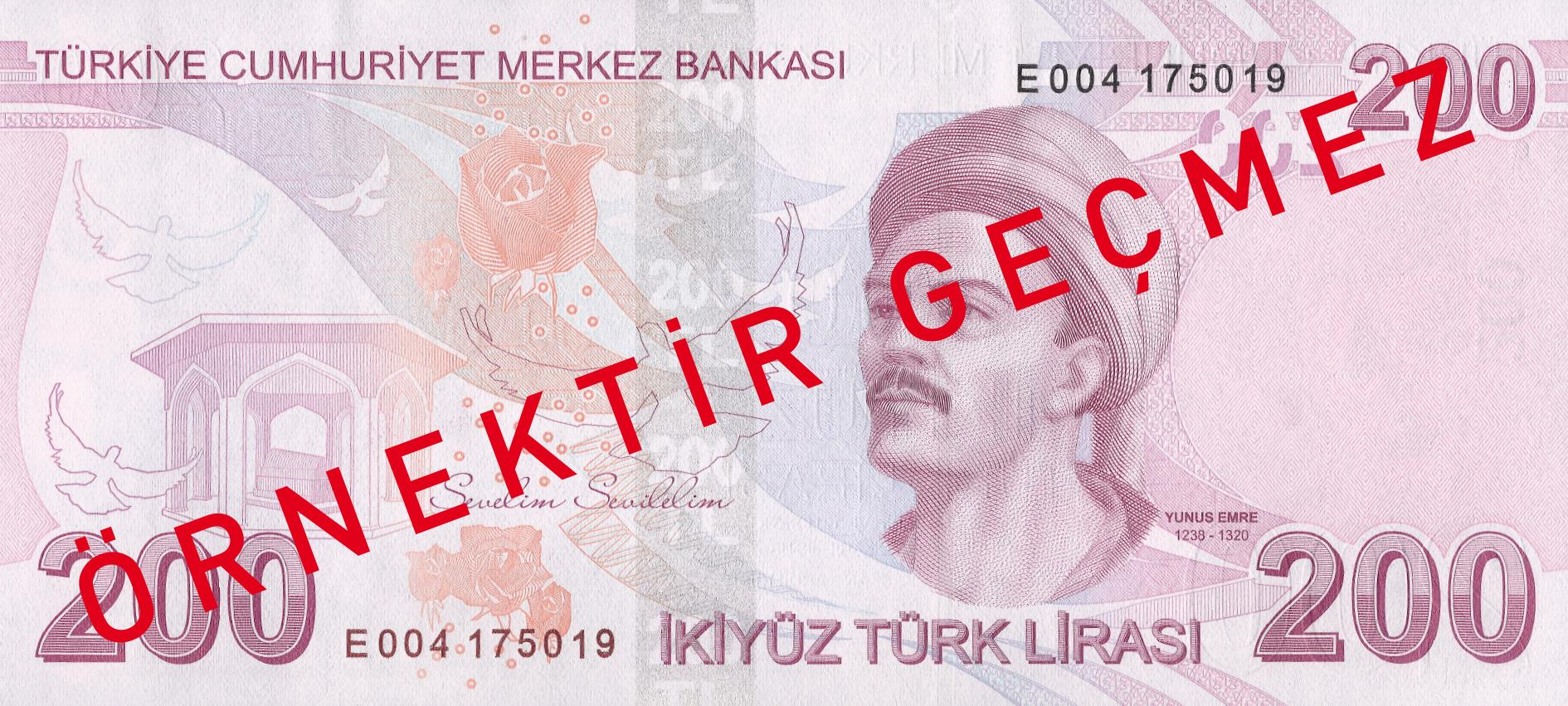
Reverse of the 200-lira banknote (2009)

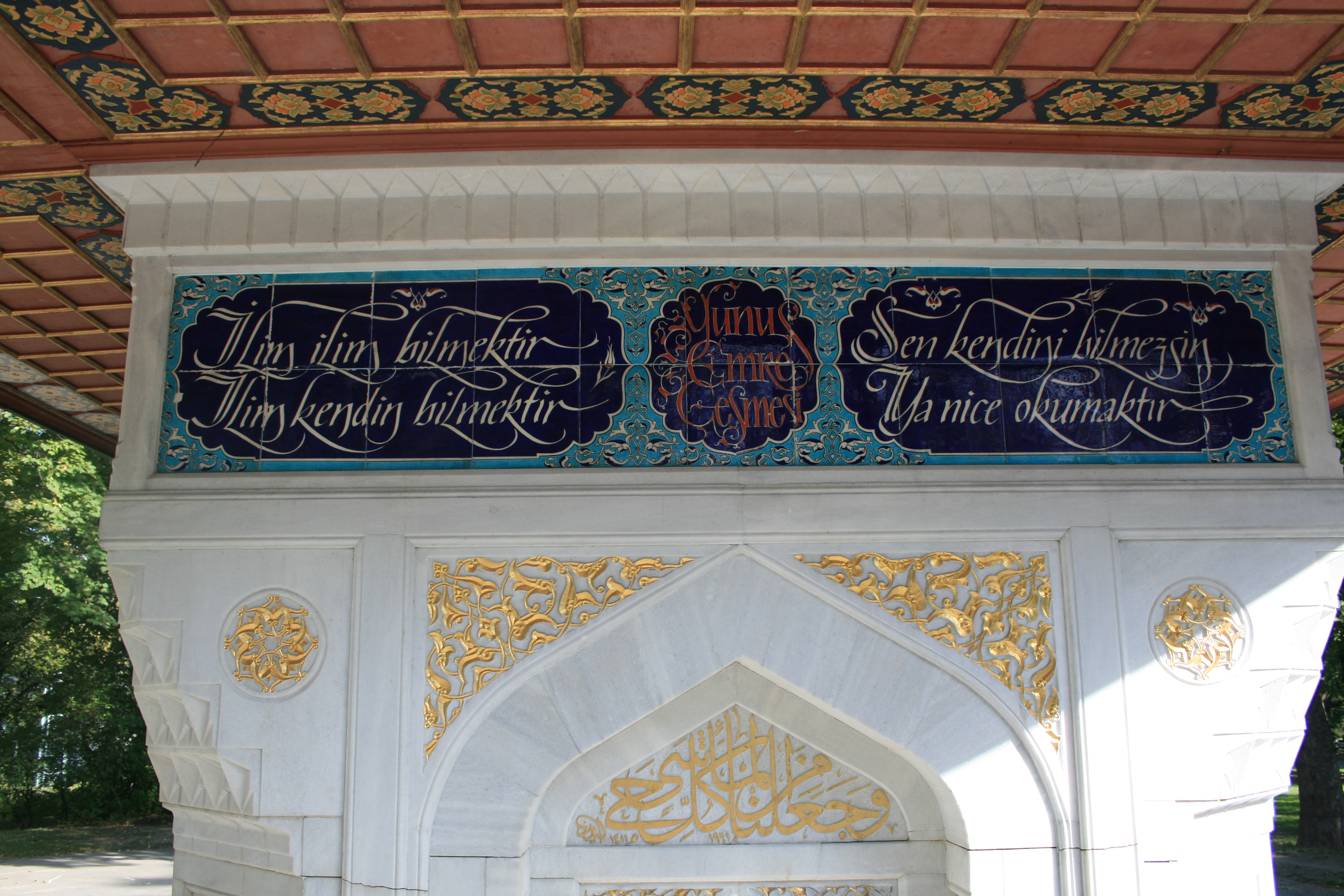
Detail of the Yunus Emre Fountain in the Türkenschanzpark, Vienna, Austria

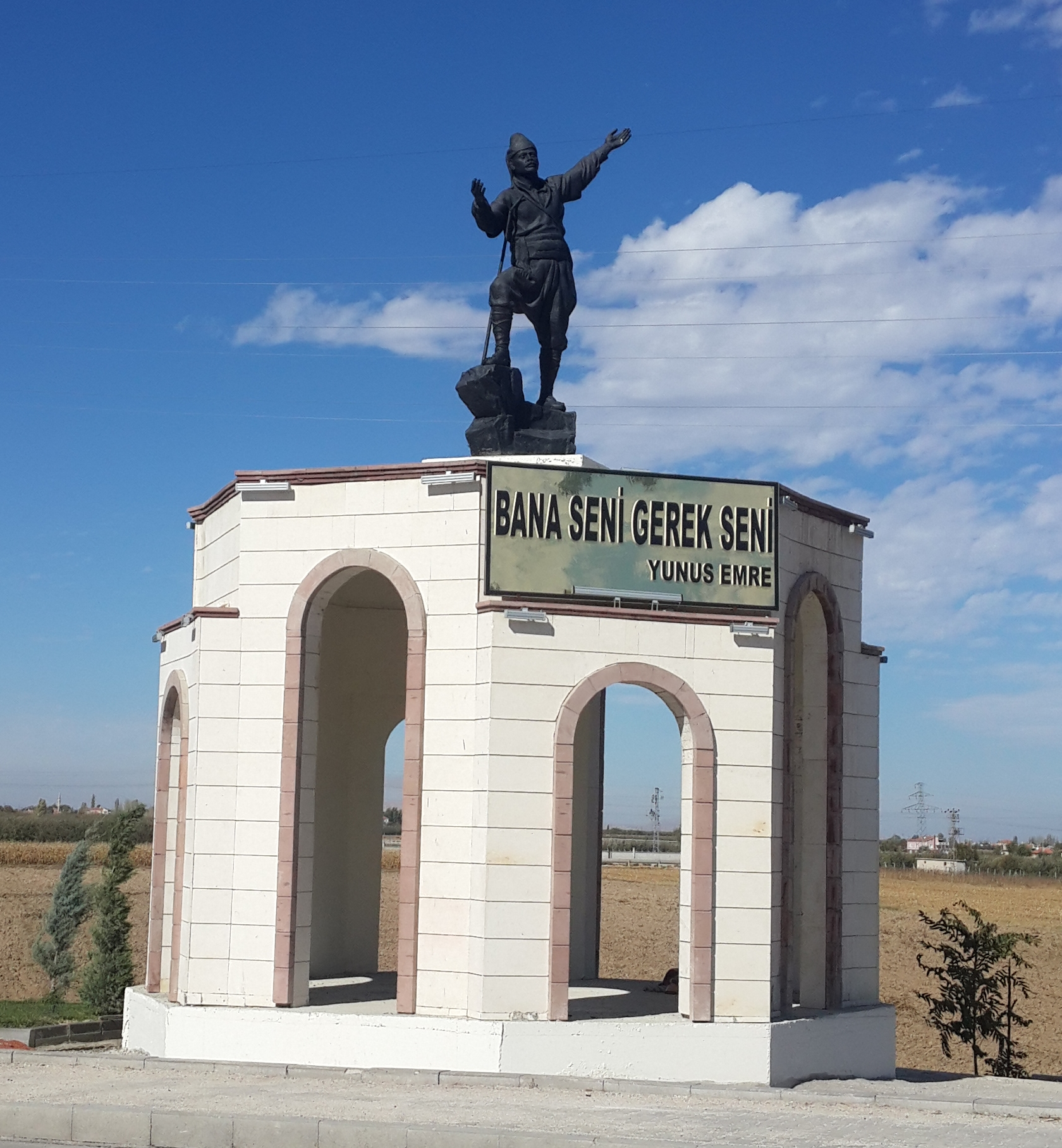
Yunus Emre Memorial, Karaman, Turkey

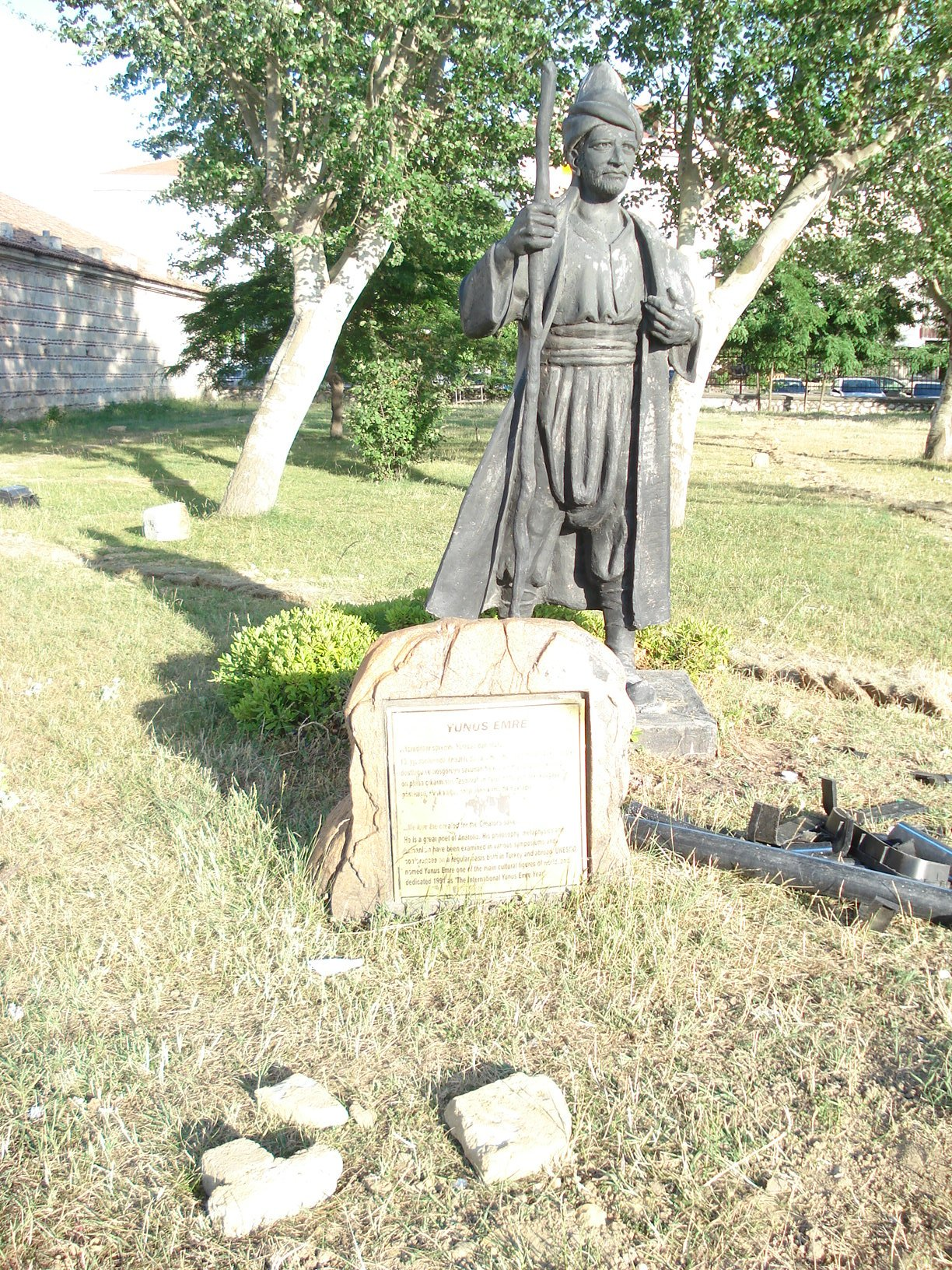
Yunus Emre Statue in Büyükçekmece, Istanbul, Turkey

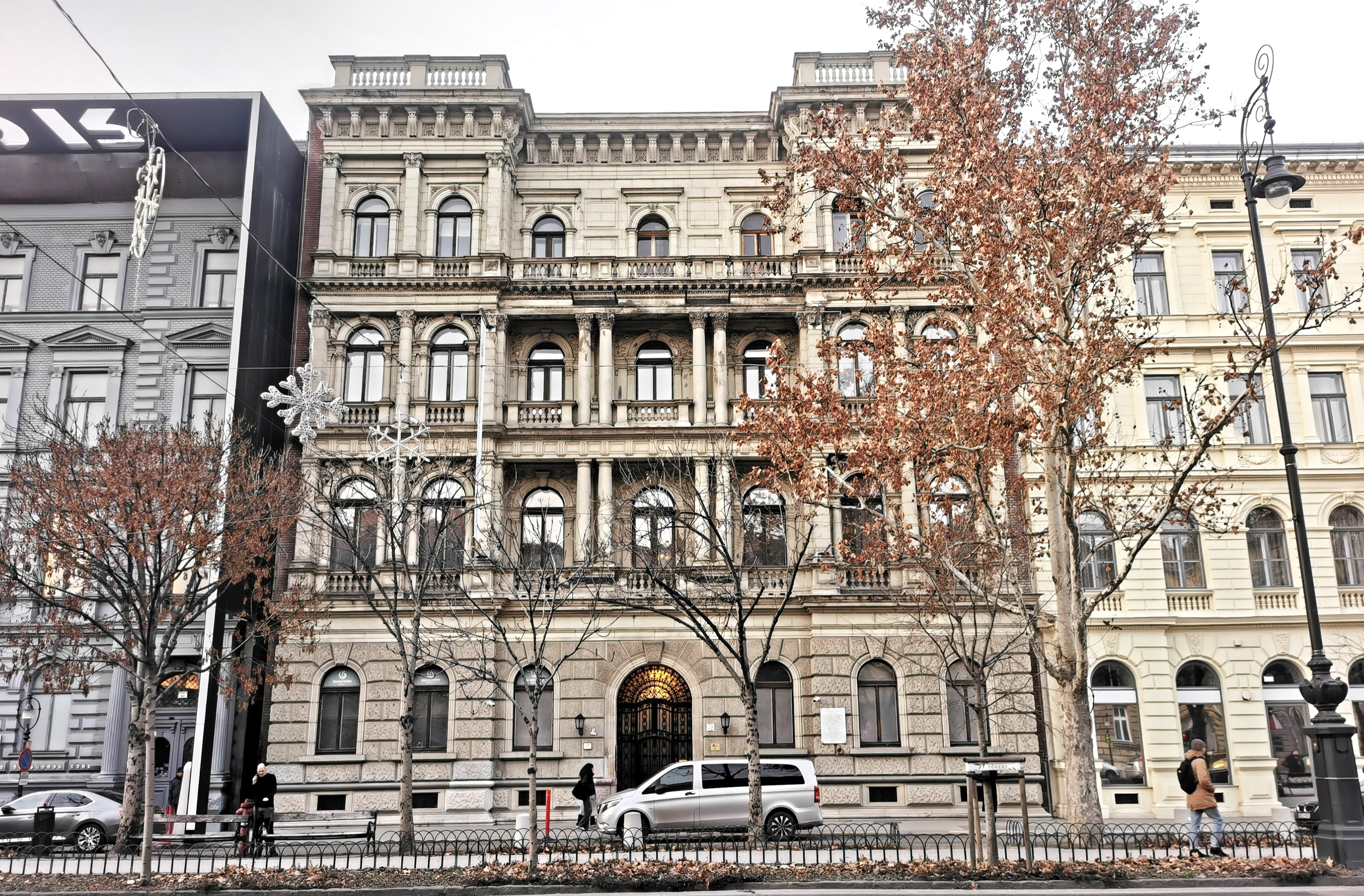
Yunus Emre Enstitüsü Budapest

== See also ==
- Yunus Emre: Aşkın Yolculuğu
- Sufism
- Turkish folk literature
- Karacaoğlan
- Yunus Emre Institute

== Sources ==
- Ambros, Edith G. (2002). "Yunus Emre". In Bearman, P. J.; Bianquis, Th.; Bosworth, C. E.; van Donzel, E. & Heinrichs, W. P. (eds.). The Encyclopaedia of Islam, Second Edition. Volume XI: W–Z. Leiden: E. J. Brill. pp. 349–350. ISBN 978-90-04-12756-2.
- Güzel, Hasan Celâl; Oğuz, Cem; Karatay, Osman, eds. (2002). The Turks: Middle ages. Vol. 2. Yeni Türkiye.
- Tatcı, Mustafa (2013). "YÛNUS EMRE". TDV Encyclopedia of Islam, Vol. 43 (Vekâlet – Yûsî) (in Turkish). Istanbul: Presidency of Religious Affairs, Centre for Islamic Studies. pp. 600–606. ISBN 978-975-389-754-9.
