= Yunus Emre: Aşkın Yolculuğu =

Turkish television series

- Genre: Biography; Historical; Sufism
- Created by: Mehmet Bozdağ; Mustafa Tatçi
- Based on: Yunus Emre
- Directed by: Emre Konuk; Kamil Aydin
- Starring: Gökhan Atalay
- Composers: Mehmet Bozdağ; Isa Yildiz
- Country of origin: Turkey
- Original languages: Turkish
- No. of seasons: 2
- No. of episodes: 44

Production
- Executive producer: Mehmet Bozdağ
- Production locations: Riva, Istanbul, Turkey
- Cinematography: Ercan Isik
- Running time: 115–125 minutes
- Production company: Tekden Film

Original release
- Network: TRT 1 (HD) TRT 4K
- Release: 18 June 2015 – 24 May 2016

Yunus Emre: Aşkın Yolculuğu (transl. Yunus Emre: Journey of Love) (Ottoman Turkish: يونس أمره: آشقین يولجيلغی) is a Turkish historical drama television series created by Mehmet Bozdağ, starring Yusuf Gökhan Atalay as the leading role. It premiered on TRT 1 in Turkey on June 18, 2015. It centers around the life of Yunus Emre, the 13th-century Anatolian Sufi poet who greatly influenced Anatolian culture.

== Plot ==
In 13th-century Anatolia, as Mongol invasions get more frequent, Yunus Emre travels to Nallihan where he establishes himself as a Seljuk official. After joining Taptuk Emre's dergâh (dervish monastery), he proceeds to follow his journey to become a dervish.

== Cast and characters ==
Played by	Character
Yusuf Gökhan Atalay	Yunus Emre
Payidar Tüfekçioglu	Tapduk Emre
Baran Akbulut	Molla Kasim
Asuman Çakir	Hanim Ana
Seda Tosun (2015-2016); Pelin Orhuner (2016)	Bacim Sultan
Müge Uyar	Kira
Mehmet Çepiç	Ahi Mesud
Mehmet Ali Tuncer	Boluluzade Ali Tayagu
Ruzgar Aksoy	Minberci Hassan
Sedat Erdis	Demirci Bayram
Murat Ercanli	Kececi Azmi
Ahmet Talay	Dülger Sahin
Umut Tanyolu	Yunus Guyende
Kaptan Gürman	Aynali
Saygin Asan	Aktar Hüsnü
Mehmet Önder	Sahin Bey
Serhan Toksoy	Saruhan
Arda Kalayci	Yetim Ismail
Mehmet Ali Kaptanlar	Candaroglu Argun Bey
Ceyda Kasabali	Zahide Sultan

== Seasons ==
Season	Episodes	Network
1	22	PTV Home and Netflix
2	23	PTV Home and Netflix

== International broadcasting ==
Country	Network	Series premiere
Uzbekistan	Azon TV	13 May 2019
Bangladesh	Channel i	20 April 2019
Turkey	TRT 1, TRT Diyanet	18 June 2015, 11 January 2016
Pakistan	PTV Home	23 November 2020

== Production ==
The series is written and produced by Mehmet Bozdağ and Mustafa Tatçi, it is directed by Emre Konuk and Kamil Aydin. The theme music was produced by Zeynep Alasya, Alpay Göltekin and Caner Özkan. It has aired since June 18, 2015 on TRT 1.

== Reception ==
The series received critical acclaim in Turkey and was a success. In Pakistan, the Prime Minister of Pakistan, Imran Khan urged Pakistani people to watch the movie if they are interested in Sufism. The show was then dubbed in Urdu and was aired on PTV Home and was well-received by Pakistani people.

== See also ==
- List of Islamic films
- Diriliş: Ertuğrul
- Kuruluş: Osman
- Bab'Aziz
- El Haimoune
- Alif (TV series)
