= Instituto Cervantes =

Nonprofit organization promoting Spanish culture

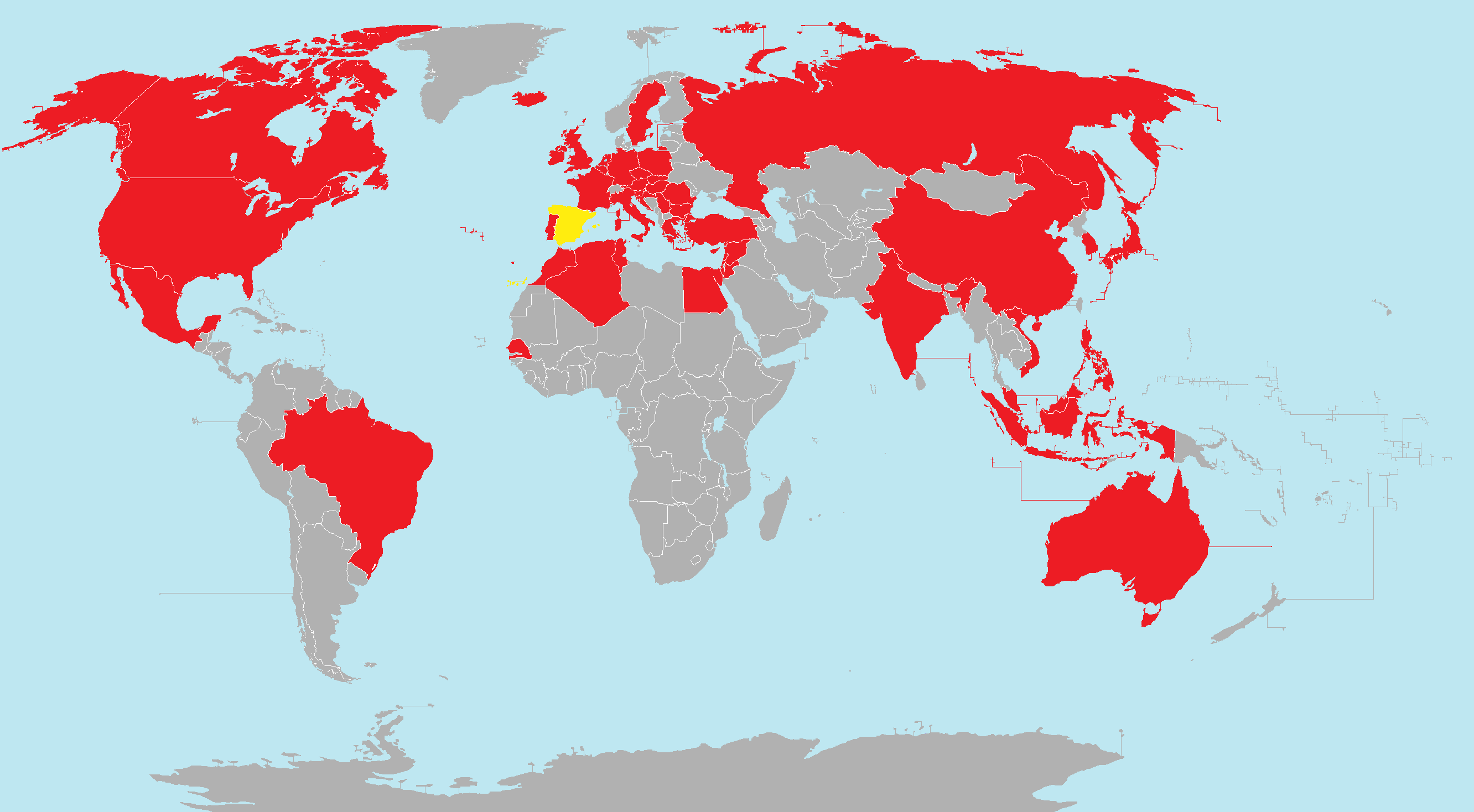
- Countries with Cervantes Institute branches
- Founded: 11 May 1991; 35 years ago
- Founder: Government of Spain
- Type: Cultural institution
- Location: Alcalá, 49. Madrid
- Region served: Worldwide (45 countries)
- Product: Spanish cultural and language education
- Members: 148,670 students (2019)
- Owner: Government of Spain
- Key people: Felipe VI (Honorary President); Susana Sumelzo (Chairwoman); Luis García Montero (Director)
- Employees: 951 (2019)
- Volunteers: 1,240 (2019)
- Website: www.cervantes.es

Instituto Cervantes (Spanish: [instiˈtuto θerˈβantes], the Cervantes Institute) is a worldwide nonprofit organization created by the Spanish government in 1991. It is named after Miguel de Cervantes (1547–1616), the author of Don Quixote and perhaps the most important figure in the history of Spanish literature. The Cervantes Institute is the largest organization in the world responsible for promoting the study and the teaching of Spanish language and culture.

This organization has branched out to 52 countries with 103 centres devoted to the Spanish and Hispanic American culture and Spanish language. Article 3 of Law 7/1991, of March 21, created the Instituto Cervantes as a government agency. The law explains that the ultimate goals of the Institute are to promote the education, the study and the use of Spanish universally as a second language; to support the methods and activities that would help the process of Spanish language education, and to contribute to the advancement of the Spanish and Hispanic American cultures throughout non-Spanish-speaking countries.

== Functions ==
The functions and services of the Cervantes Institute are:

- It designs Spanish language courses, offering two kinds of courses: general and special.
- It offers the Diplomas of Spanish as Foreign Language (DELE) examinations on behalf of the Spanish Ministry of Education. This is an official qualification certifying levels of competence in the Spanish language, and is the only certificate for non-native Spanish speakers that is officially recognised in Spain. The diplomas are subdivided into six levels, each one corresponding to a certain proficiency level as described by the Common European Framework of Reference for Languages: A1, A2, B1, B2, C1, C2.
- It improves the methods of Spanish education.
  - On-line Spanish language learning environment Ex) AVE (Aula Virtual de Español)
  - Creating a social, cultural and educational environment in each centre
  - A student-centred plan, focusing on the dialogues between teacher and student over objectives and contents
- It supports Hispanists and "Hispanism", which is the study of the culture of Spain and Hispanic America.
  - Sponsors lectures, book presentations, concerts, art exhibitions, The Spain Film Festival and Festival of Flamenco. Supported by other organisations and communities.
- It organises and promotes the program to spread the Spanish language throughout the world.
  - The institute works with Spain's national radio and television to deliver Spanish language courses.
  - Publications, on-line bibliographies, library holdings, the hosting of major conferences on the state of the Spanish language.
- It administers the Constitutional and Sociocultural Knowledge of Spain (CCSE) examinations worldwide, which are a legal requirement for the acquisition of Spanish nationality.
- It establishes libraries and centres.
- It also publishes the Anuario del español to analyse and report on the situation and development of the Spanish language in different places.
- It supports the Centro Virtual Cervantes on the internet since 1997.

== Academic programme ==
General language courses are offered at four different levels: elementary, intermediate, advanced and high advanced.

1. Improving specific language skills, such as reading, speaking, and writing
2. Teaching Spanish for specific purposes, such as business, medical, legal, or translation
3. Learning about the literature and cultures of the Spanish-speaking countries
4. Preparation for Diplomas of Spanish as Foreign Language

The Cervantes Institute offers comprehensive Spanish language classes to:

1. Develop the student's ability to use the language in a variety of contexts, paying special attention to the differences of Spanish accents.
2. To provide different resources, including Spanish on-line, to improve the teaching.
3. To allow the students to use any of the facilities of the Cervantes Institute around the world.
4. To issue Spanish language diplomas and certificates

== Administration ==
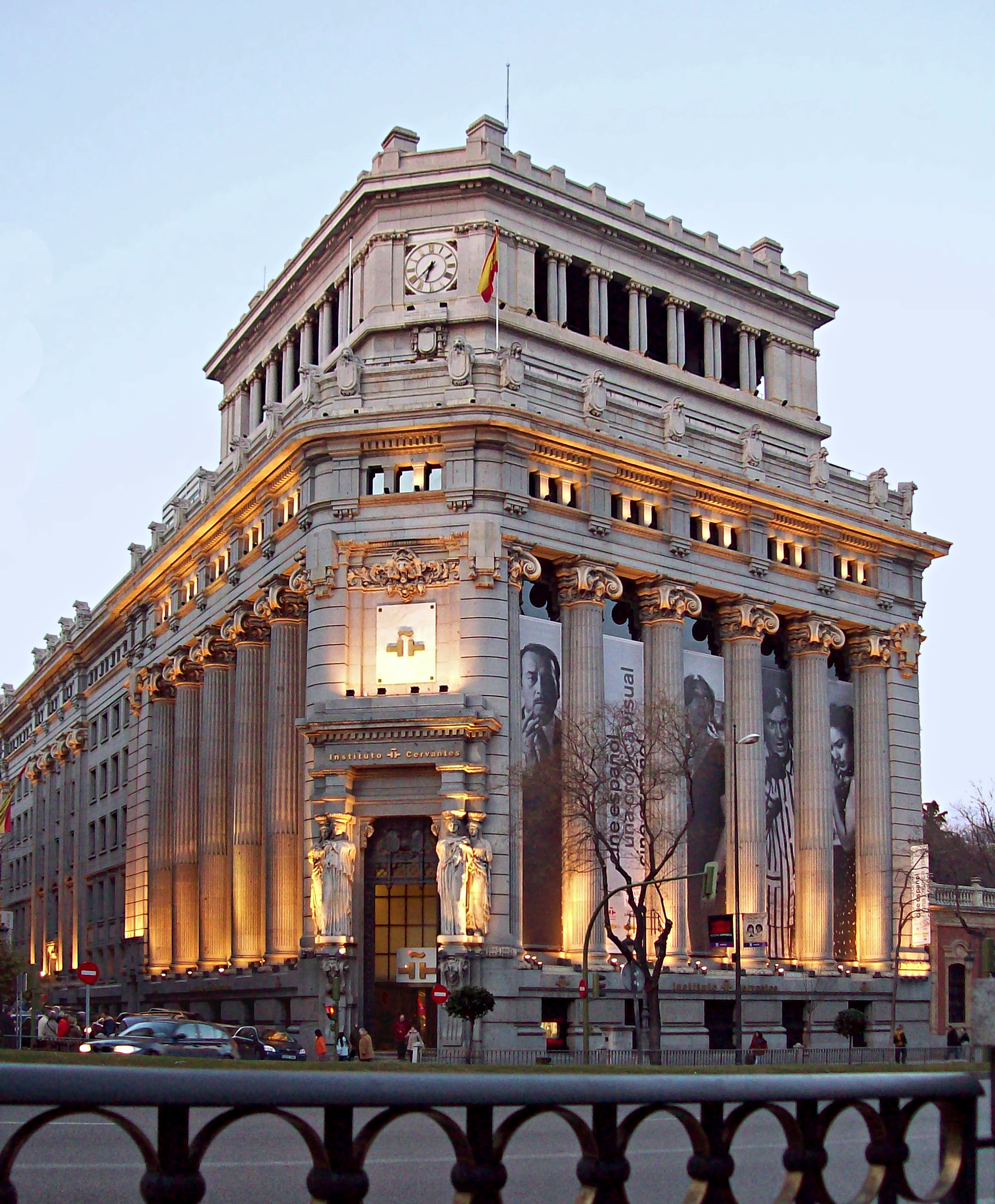
Cervantes Institute headquarters, in Madrid

The administration of the Cervantes Institute is subdivided into three parts. A commitment and interest in planning the activities and direction of the Institute are managed by a high-profile membership.

1. Patronato (Board of Trustees): The Cervantes Institute is overseen by its governing body, the Patronato. The Patronato normally includes King Felipe VI as honorary president and the Prime Minister, as well as representatives from the world of culture and letters in Spain and in the Americas. The executive presidency is held by the Secretaries of State of Education and Science, Culture, the president and vice-president of the Council of Administration, the Director of the institute, 25 elected members from cultural and language institutions. It gives general directions for the activities of the Institute and informs on its annual activities.
2. The Consejo de Administración (Board of Directors) is a management body and approves the general plans and projects of the institute. It consists of representatives from the ministries of Foreign Affairs, Education, Culture and Sport, Treasury, and Home Affairs, as well as from the Patronato. This is presided by the Secretary of State for International Cooperation and consists of two vice-presidents (Under-Secretary of the Science and Education Department and the Under-Secretary of the Department of Culture), two advisers of the Patronato, and four advisers from the Secretaries of State, Education and Science, Culture and of Economy and Treasury and the Director of the institute.
3. The Director is appointed by the Council of Ministers. The Director is in charge of guiding the management of the institute, and other pertinent executive and administrative tasks.

== Virtual presence ==
Centro Virtual Cervantes is an online service that was created in December 1997 by the Instituto Cervantes of Spain to contribute to the diffusion of the Spanish language and Hispanic cultures. It became one of the most important reference sites devoted to Spanish language and culture, having reached an average of over 100,000 visitors a month, including both professionals and the general public. It offers resources and services to teachers, students, translators, journalists and other professionals involved with the Spanish language, and as well as to Hispanists throughout the world, who study Hispanic cultures, and to any person who is interested in the language and Hispanic cultures. It also includes announcements of cultural events (Actos Culturales), four discussion forums, each of which focuses on a specific topic, and the language classroom, Aula de Lengua, designed for both teachers and learners of Spanish. The Instituto Cervantes also has a virtual presence in the 3D virtual world Second Life.

== Centro de Formación de Profesores ==
On 13 December 2004, the Cervantes Institute formed its Centro de Formación de Profesores in its headquarters, located in Alcalá de Henares, where Cervantes was born. This institution was founded to encourage the teaching of Spanish as a foreign language and to provide useful resources to its members. Throughout the year, it organises the specific activities and programmes for the centre, with several different goals, which include teaching, providing the resources to the teachers to use in their education field, and developing specialised knowledge of the Spanish language for educational purposes. The centre supports the future teachers of Spanish through its 'Master of Education in Spanish as a Foreign Language', in collaboration with the International University Menéndez Pelayo. For teachers already involved in teaching, the Centre provides advanced activities that produce a deeper knowledge, focusing on research or discussion in the classroom, and improving the students' skills in Spanish language for them to become responsive in any communicational situations.

== Free translator service ==
The Automatic Translator Service of the Cervantes Institute, "Portal de las Tecnologías Lingüisticas en España", was launched by the Cervantes Institute on 10 January 2005. It is a free service of machine translation sponsored by Telefónica. Since its launch, demand has steadily increased monthly to 55%, and it has performed more than 582,000 free translations. The Cervantes Institute's purpose in creating this service was to facilitate the access of Spanish to those information technology contents developed in other languages, and so people who speak other languages can have access to contents that are only available in Spanish. This service permits translation of texts and text files, as well as web pages, from Spanish to Catalan, French, Galician, English or Portuguese and vice versa. The pairs of language percentages used are as follows: English–Spanish, 23.47% of the total; Spanish–Catalan, 21.12%; Spanish–English, 13.64%; Portuguese–Spanish, 12.63%; Spanish–Portuguese, 10.39%; Catalan–Spanish, 6.48%; Spanish–French, 6.24%, and French–Spanish, 6.03%.

== Publications ==
Since 1998, the Instituto Cervantes has published the annual El español en el mundo highlighting the state of Spanish in the world, and current trends. This publication also includes the annual report Spanish: A Living Language, which quantitatively analyzes the situation of the Spanish language worldwide. The Instituto has also run the Internet-based Centro Virtual Cervantes since 1997.

== Recognition ==
In 2005, along with the Alliance française, the Società Dante Alighieri, the British Council, the Goethe-Institut, and the Instituto Camões, the Instituto Cervantes was awarded the Prince of Asturias Award for outstanding achievements in communications and humanities.

== Locations ==
The Instituto Cervantes has developed its educational project on a system of local institutions and centres:

1. Institutos Cervantes (IC: full-fledged centres)
2. Antenas (A: establishments that depend on a IC)
3. Aulas Cervantes (AC: inside universities with "lecture halls, sometimes with teaching and cultural activity")
4. Extensiones (E: small spaces or classrooms, located in cities where there is no IC or AC. They depend, for all purposes, on a IC.)
5. Centros Acreditados (CA: they are Spanish teaching centers, whose quality has been expressly recognized by the IC, by meeting the requirements established by the ELE Center Accreditation System of the Cervantes Institute. There are 220 centers. 183 in Spain and 37 in other countries)

A representative list follows, the most recent and complete list can be found at www.cervantes.es.

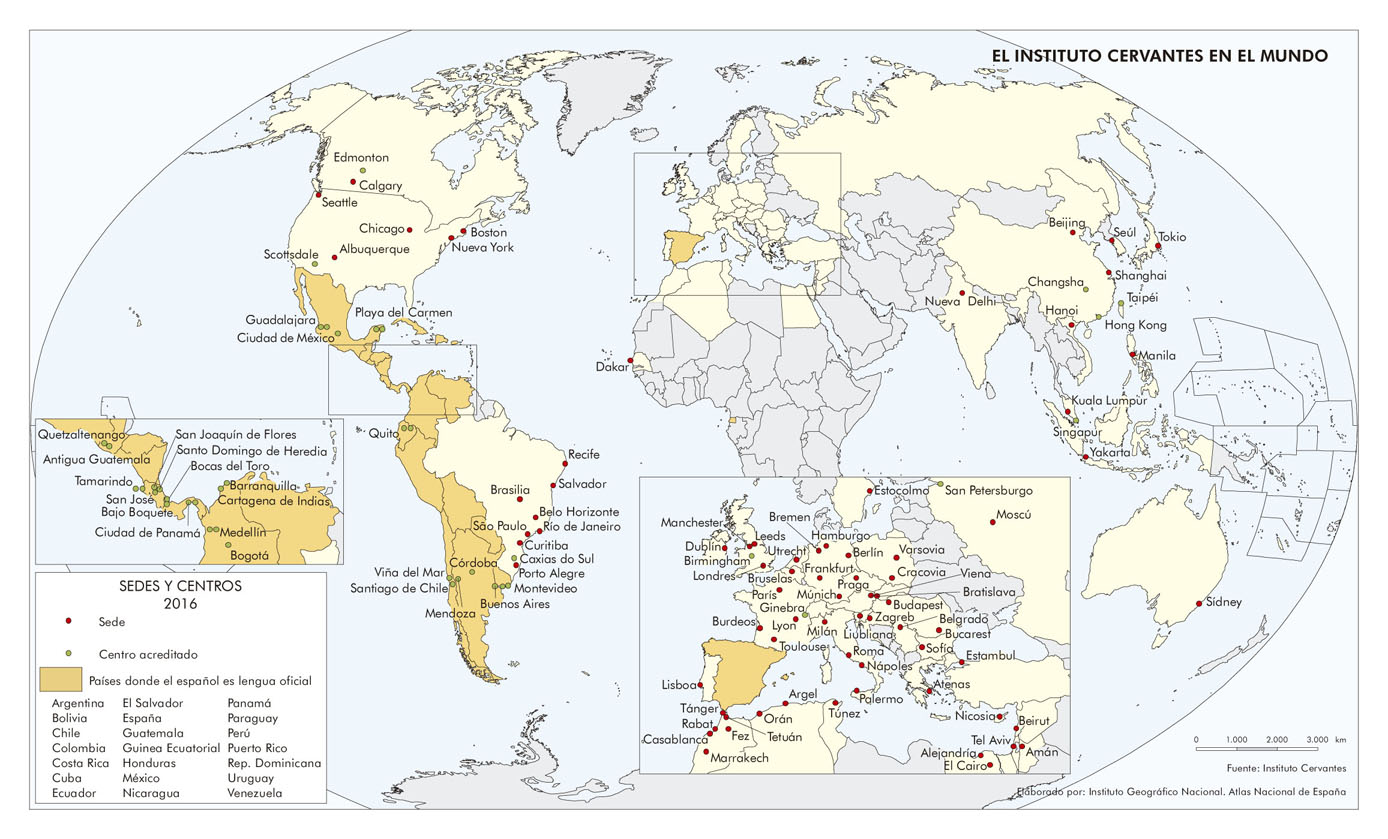
Map of the Institutos Cervantes in the world as of 2016.

- Africa
  - Algeria (IC: Algiers, Oran)
  - Egypt (IC: Cairo, A: Alexandria)
  - Ivory Coast (AC: Abidjan)
  - Morocco (IC: Casablanca, Fez, Rabat, Tangier, Tétouan, Marrakesh)
  - Mauritania (E: Nouakchott)
  - Senegal (IC: Dakar)
  - Tunisia (IC: Tunis)
- Americas except Hispanic America
  - Brazil (IC: Rio de Janeiro, São Paulo, Brasília, Salvador, Belo Horizonte, Porto Alegre, Recife, Curitiba, CA: Caxias do Sul)
  - Canada (IC: Toronto, AC: Calgary (Note: University of Calgary), CA: Edmonton)
  - United States (IC: Albuquerque, Chicago, Los Angeles, New York, AC: Boston (Note: Harvard University), Seattle (Note: University of Washington), E: El Paso, CA: Scottsdale, Florida)
- Asia except West Asia
  - China (IC: Beijing, Shanghai, CA: Hong Kong)
  - India (IC: New Delhi, CA: Mumbai)
  - Indonesia AC: Jakarta)
  - Japan (IC: Tokyo)
  - Jordan (IC: Amman)
  - Philippines (IC: Makati, AC: Manila)
  - South Korea (IC: Seoul)
  - Indonesia (AC: Jakarta)
  - Malaysia (AC: Kuala Lumpur) (Note: HELP University)
  - Thailand (E: Bangkok)
  - Vietnam (AC: Hanoi) (Note: University of Hanoi)
- Europe except Spain
  - Austria (IC: Vienna)
  - Belgium (IC: Brussels)
  - Bulgaria (IC: Sofia)
  - Czech Republic (IC: Prague)
  - France (IC: Bordeaux, Lyon, Paris, Toulouse)
  - Germany (IC: Berlin, Bremen, Frankfurt, Hamburg, Munich)
  - Greece (IC: Athens, (Note: The original Athens Cervantes Institute opened in 1992; in March 2010, Greek-born Queen Sofía of Spain opened its new building.) E: Thessaloniki)
  - Hungary (IC: Budapest)
  - Ireland (IC: Dublin) (Note: 53.341975°N 6.251575°W)
  - Italy (IC: Milan, Naples, Palermo, Rome)
  - Netherlands (IC: Utrecht, E: Amsterdam)
  - Poland (IC: Warsaw, Kraków, CA: Wrocław)
  - Portugal (IC: Lisbon)
  - Romania (IC: Bucharest)
  - Russia (IC: Moscow, CA: Saint Petersburg)
  - Serbia (IC: Belgrade)
  - Sweden (IC: Stockholm)
  - United Kingdom (IC: London, Manchester, A:Leeds, E: Edinburgh)
  - Croatia (AC: Zagreb (Note: University of Zagreb))
  - Slovakia (AC: Bratislava (Note: Comenius University))
  - Slovenia (AC: Liubliana)
  - Turkey (IC: Istanbul)
  - Switzerland (CA: Geneva)
- West Asia
  - Cyprus (AC: Nicosia)
  - Iraq (E: Baghdad)
  - Israel (IC: Tel Aviv)
  - Jordan (IC: Amman)
  - Lebanon (IC: Beirut, E: Baalbek, Kaslik, Tripoli)
  - Syria (IC: Damascus)
  - Turkey (IC: Istanbul)
  - Iran (CA: Teheran)
  - United Arab Emirates (CA: Dubai)
- Oceania
  - Australia (IC: Sydney, E: Melbourne)
- Spanish speaking countries
  - Spain (IC: Madrid, Alcalá de Henares, CA: Cádiz, Córdoba, Granada, 22 in Málaga, 9 in Seville, Zaragoza, Santa Cruz de Tenerife, Cantabria, Toledo, Ávila, Burgos, Salamanca, Soria, Valladolid, 18 in Barcelona, Girona, 24 in Madrid, Navarra, 6 in Alicante, Castellón, 16 in Valencia, A Coruña, Balearic Islands, Guipuzcoa, Vizcaya.)
  - Argentina (CA: 2 in Buenos Aires, Cordoba, Mendoza)
  - Chile (CA: Viña del Mar)
  - Colombia (CA: Barranquilla, Bogotá, Medellín)
  - Costa Rica (CA: San Rafael, San Joaquin de Flores, 2 in Tamarindo, San José)
  - Ecuador (CA: Quito)
  - Guatemala (CA: Quetzaltenango)
  - Mexico (CA: Mexico City, 2 in Guadalajara, 2 in Playa del Carmen)
  - Panama (CA: 2 in Panama City)
  - Uruguay (CA: Montevideo)

== Gallery ==
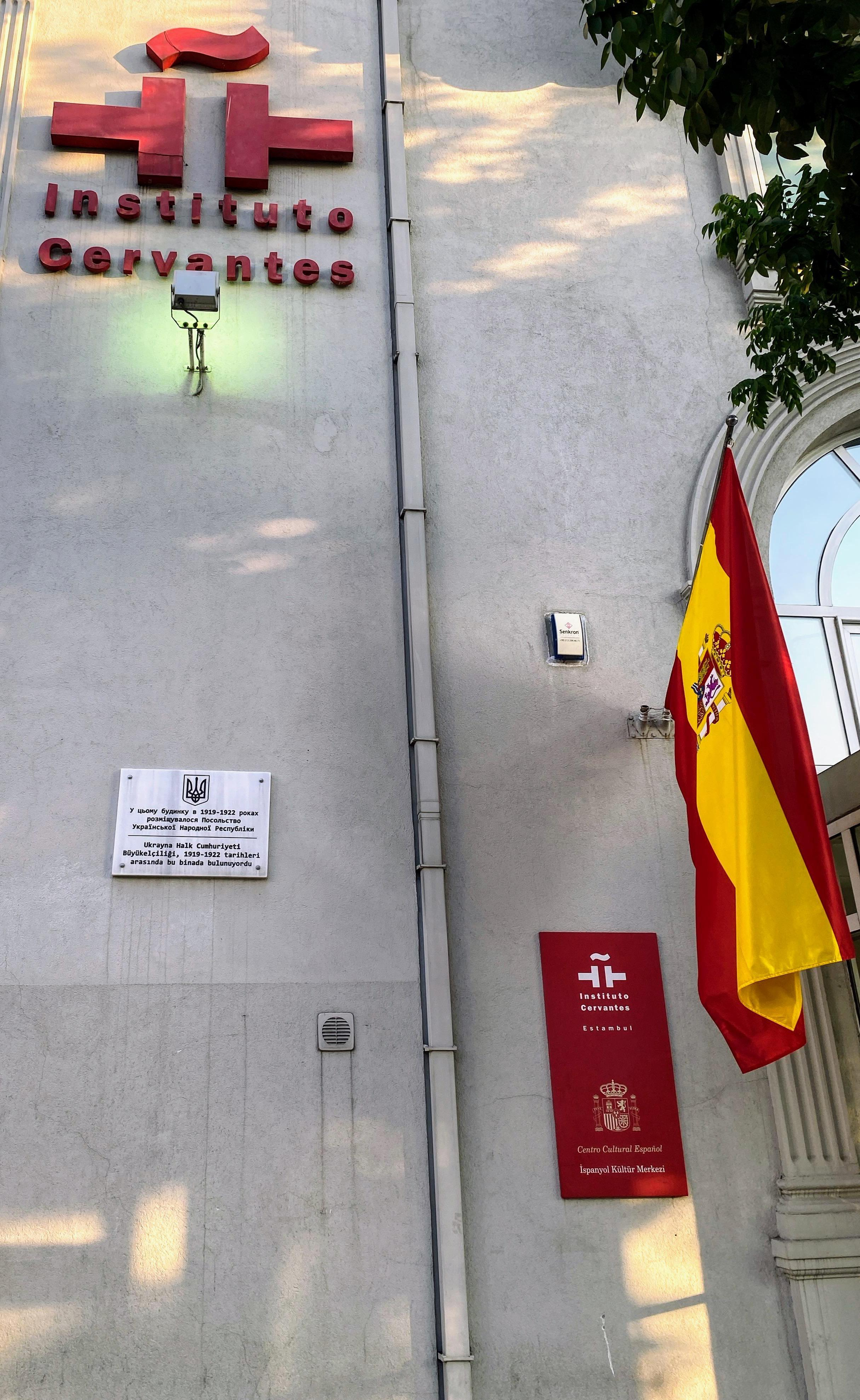
Istanbul

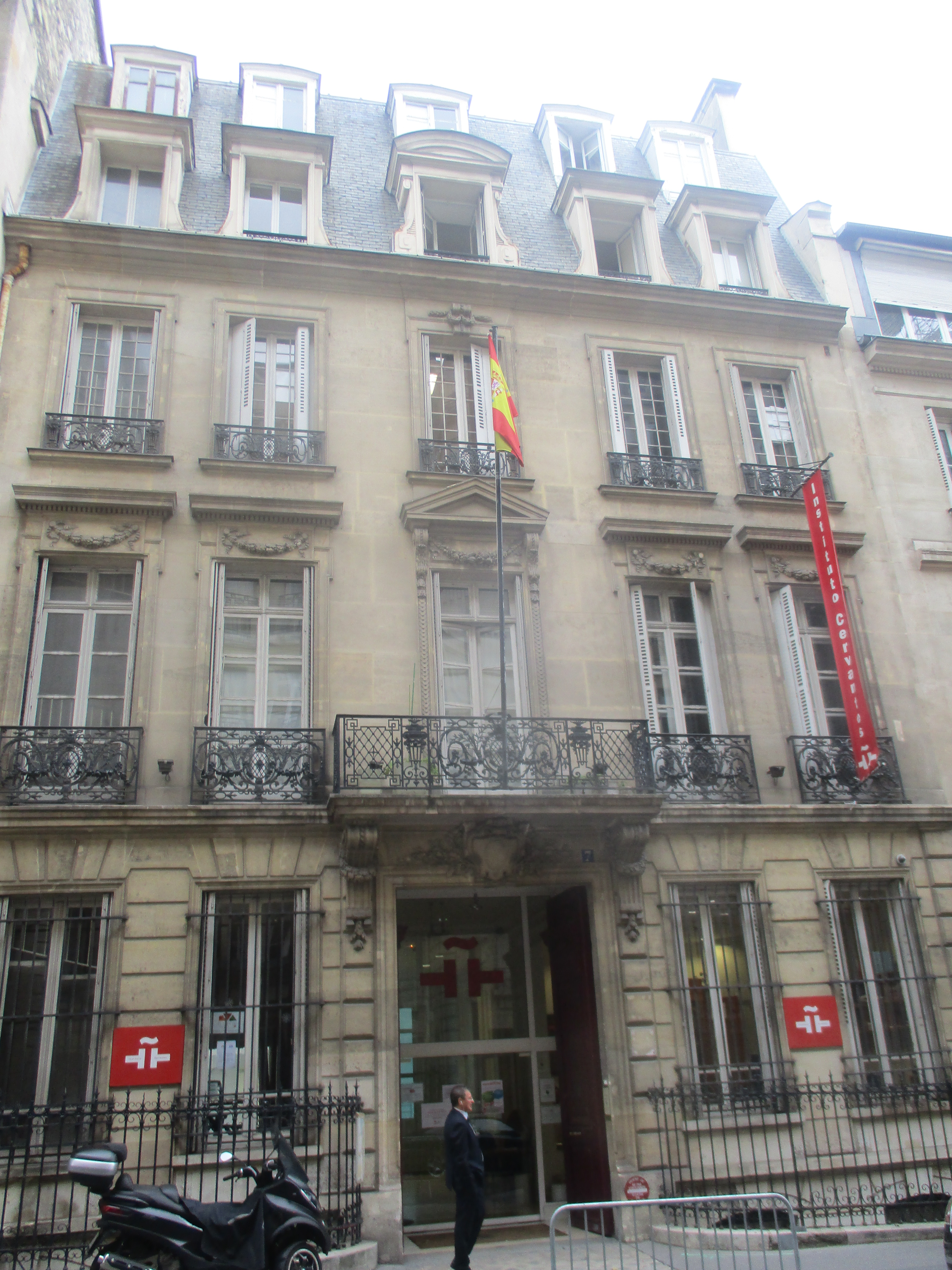
Paris

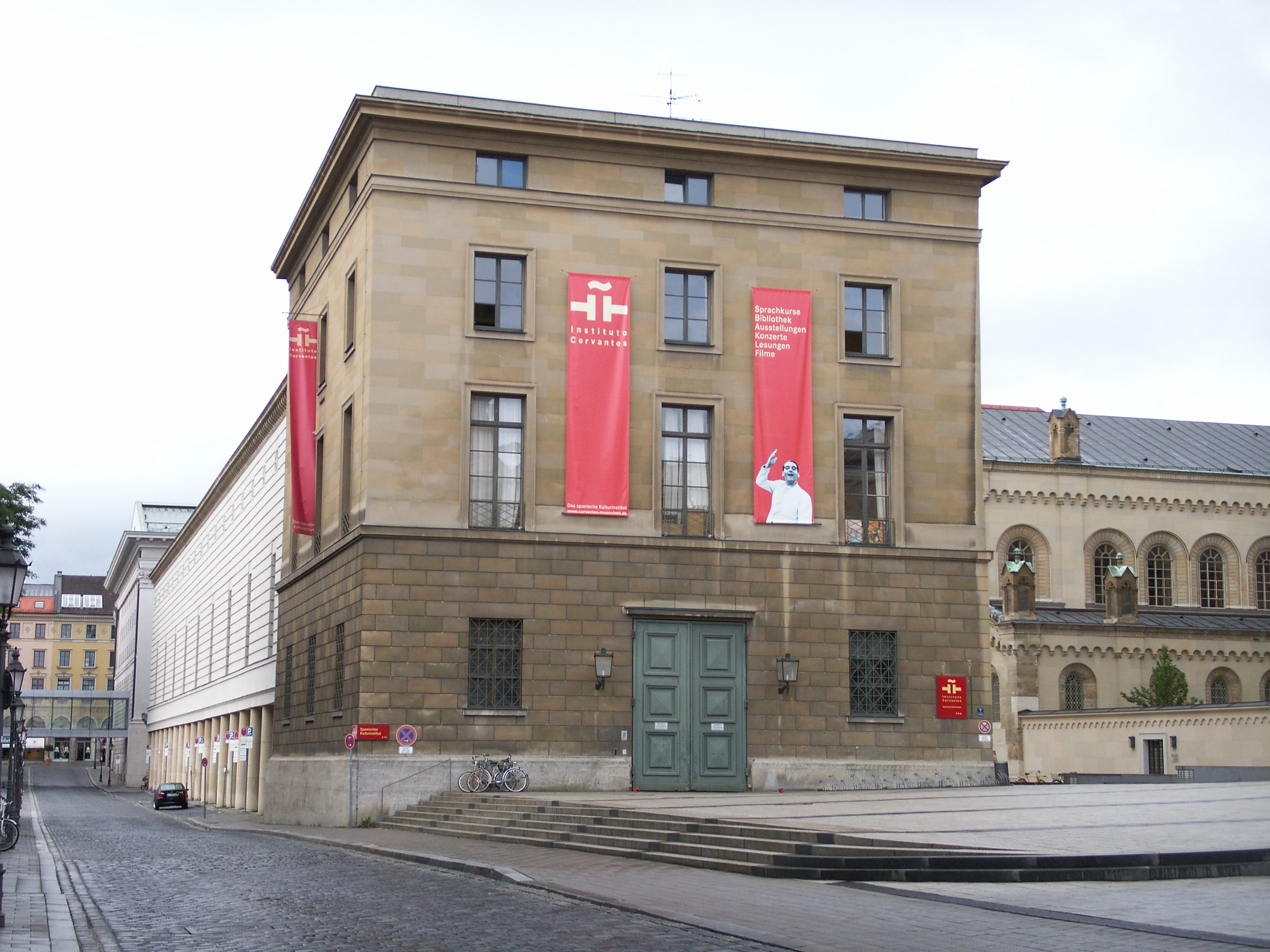
Munich

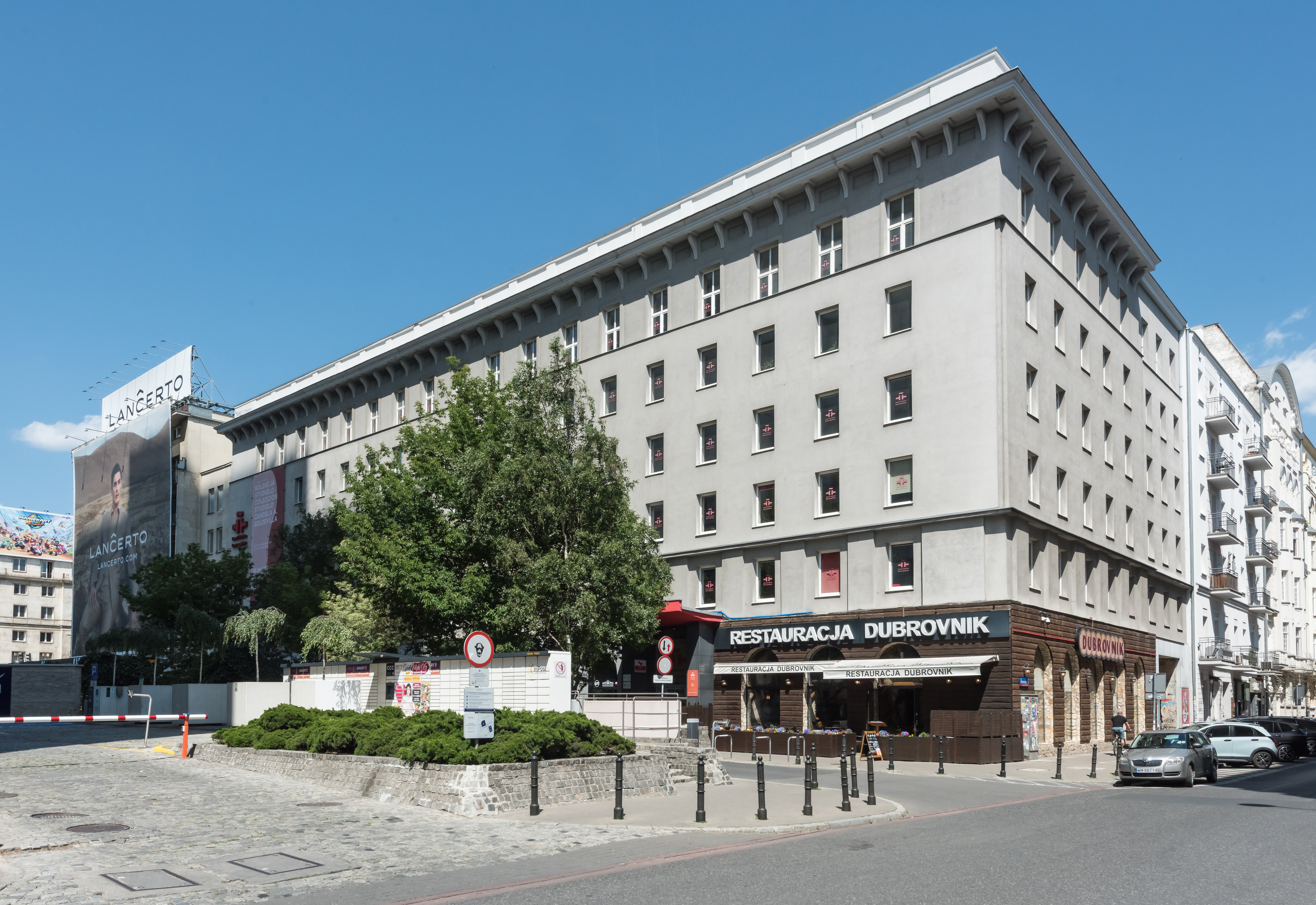
Warsaw

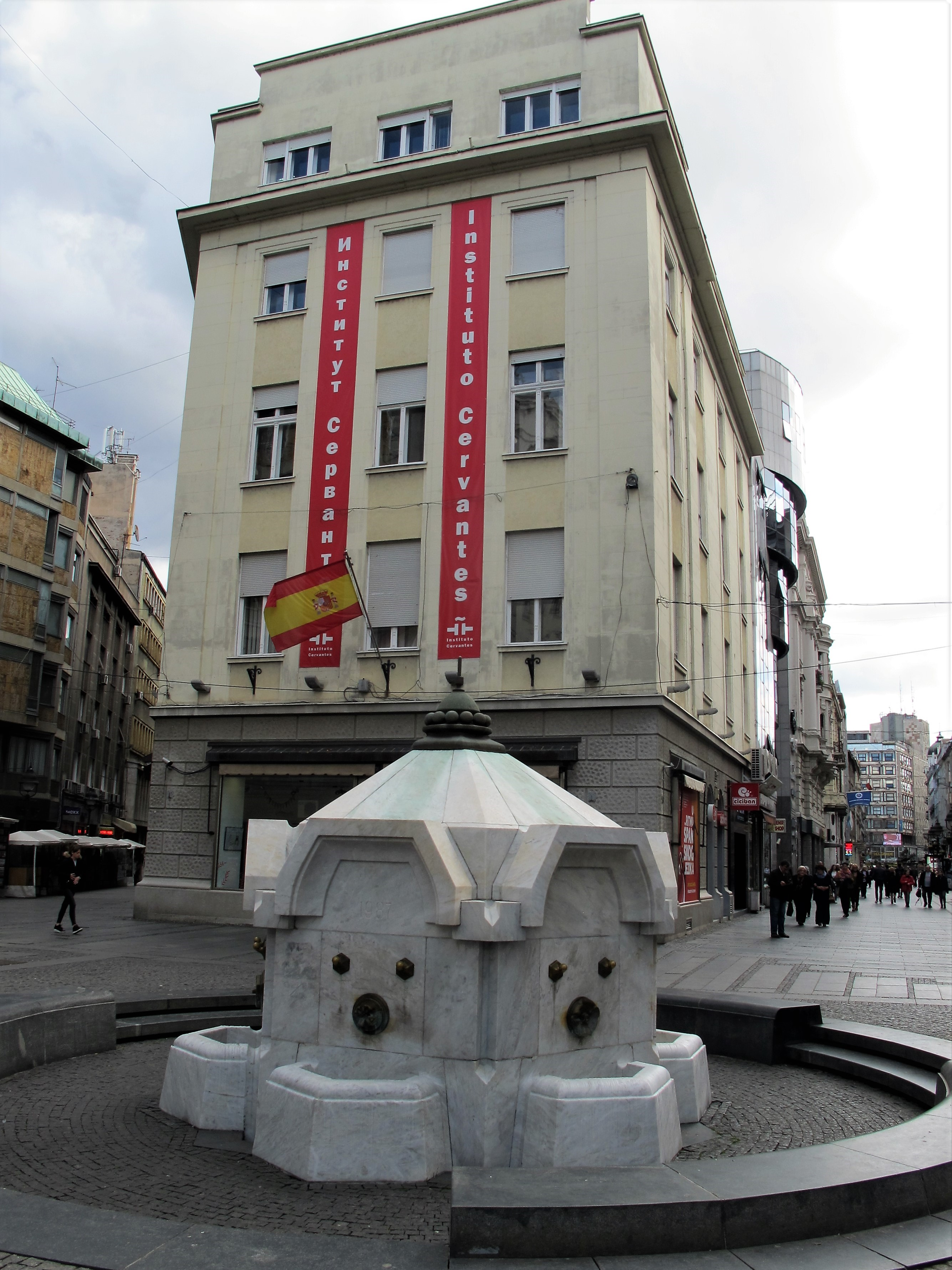
Belgrade

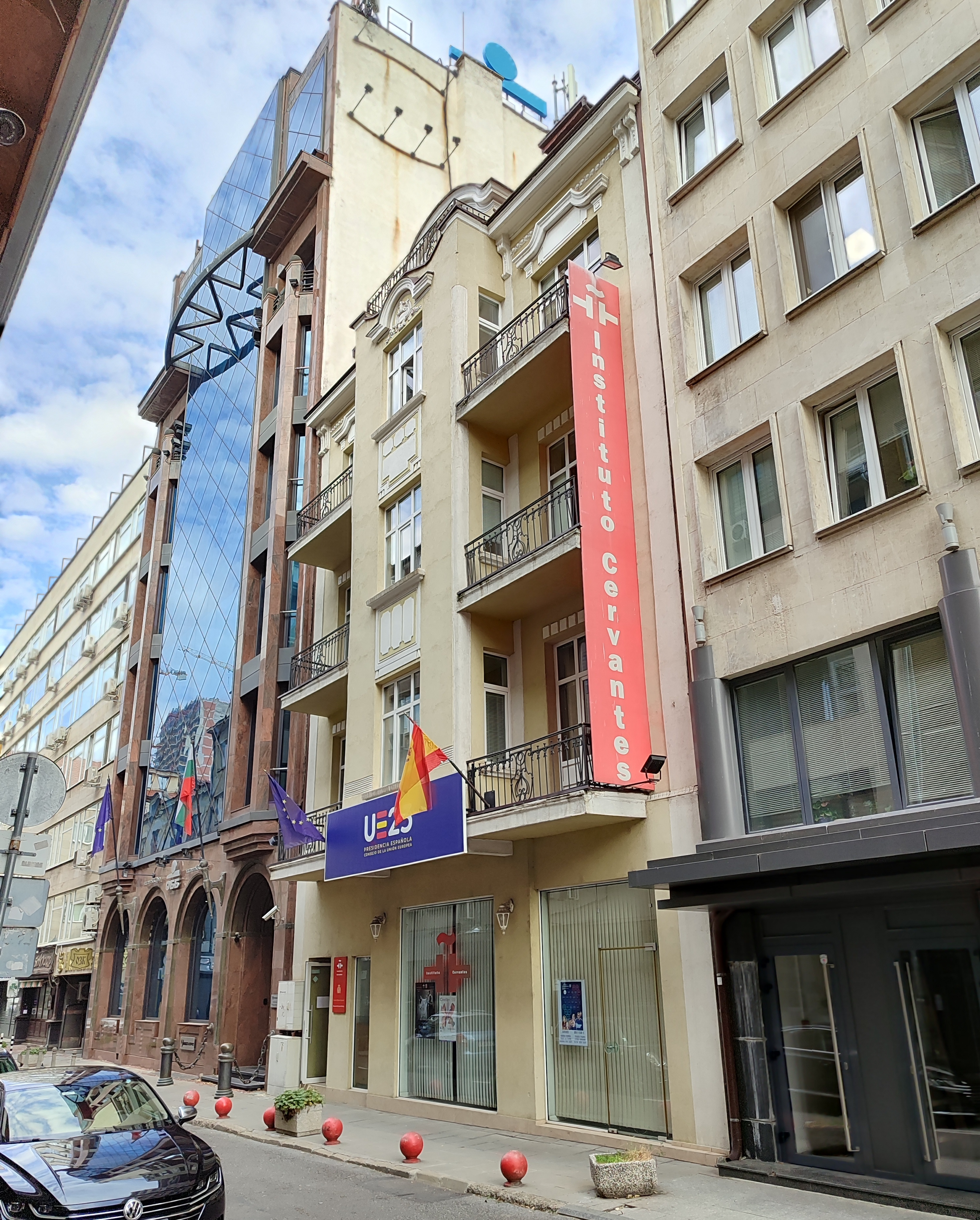
Sofia

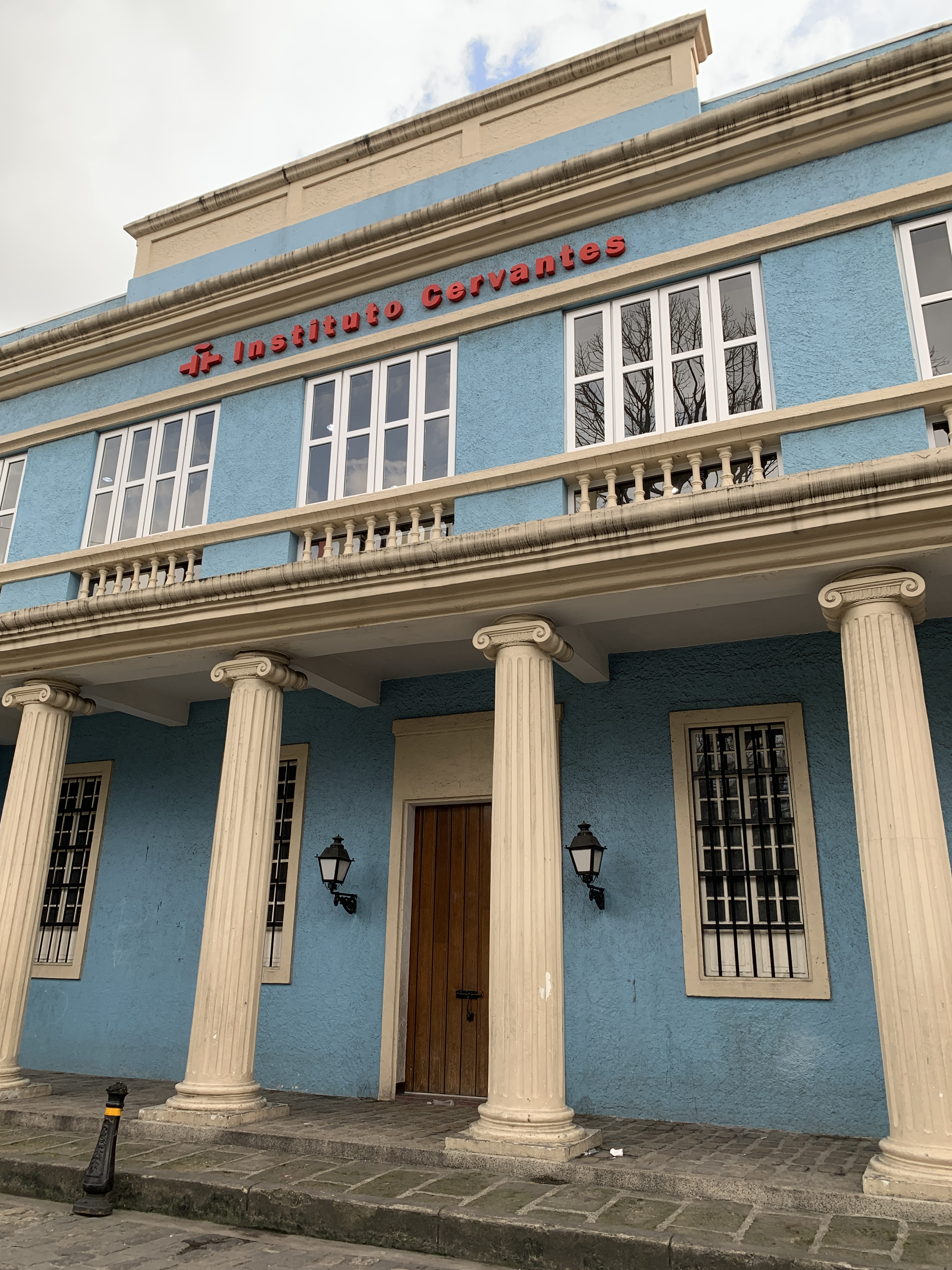
Manila

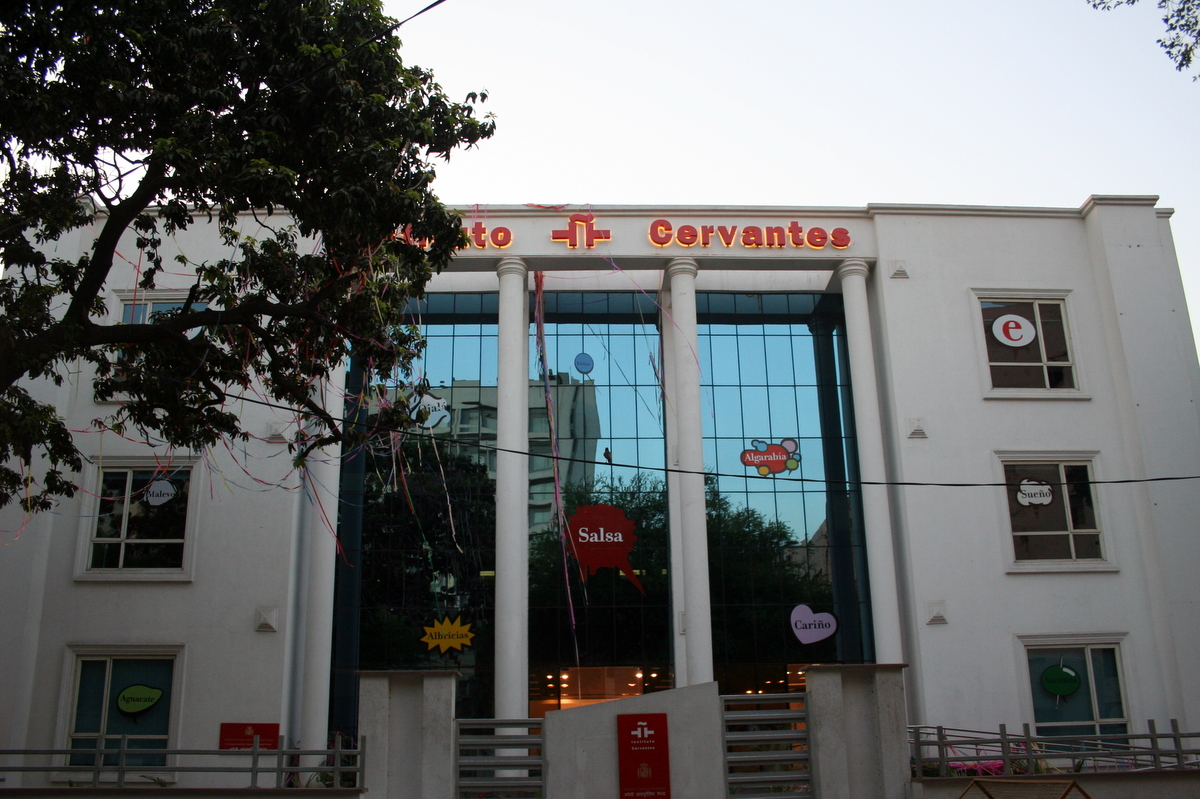
New Delhi

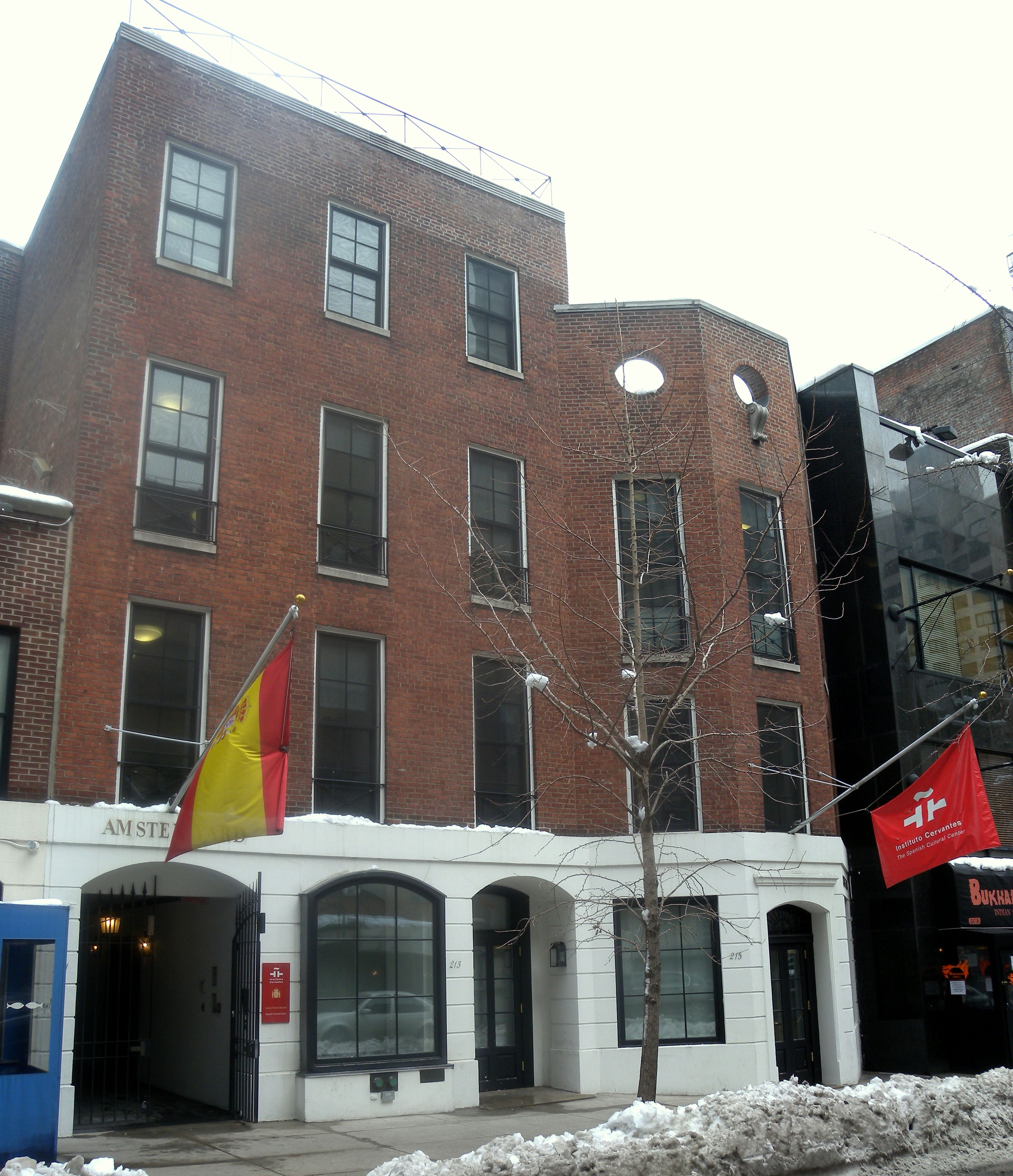
New York

== See also ==
- Alliance française
- British Council
- Cultural diplomacy
- Dante Alighieri Society
- Dutch Language Union (Taalunie)
- Goethe-Institut
- Hispanism
- Instituto Camões
- Miguel de Cervantes Prize
- Panhispanism
- Public diplomacy
- Queen Sofía Spanish Institute
- Viva Festival
