= Instituto Camões =

Portuguese international institution

Camões Institute
- Instituto Camões
- Founded: 1924; 102 years ago
- Founder: Government of Portugal
- Type: Cultural institution
- Headquarters: Seixas Palace, Avenida da Liberdade 270, Lisbon, Portugal
- Coordinates: 38°43′29.4672″N 9°8′55.932″W
- Region served: Worldwide
- Product: Portuguese cultural education
- Key people: President; Luís Faro Ramos; Vice president Gonçalo Teles Gomes
- Website: Instituto Camões

The Instituto Camões (English: Camões Institute), formally, Camões — Instituto da Cooperação e da Língua, I. P. (English: Camões — Institute for Cooperation and Language, Public Institute), is a Portuguese international institution dedicated to the worldwide promotion of the Portuguese language, Portuguese culture, and international aid, on behalf of the Government of Portugal. Headquartered in Lisbon with centers across five continents, the mission of the Instituto Camões is the promotion of Portugal's language, culture, values, charity, and economy. The institution is named for Portuguese Renaissance author Luís Vaz de Camões, considered the greatest poet of the Portuguese language and the national poet of Portugal.

Originating in the early 20th century as the Portuguese Institute for High Culture, the institution restructured with a greater linguistic focus in 1980, and absorbed the Portuguese Institute for Development Support, Portugal's development aid agency, in 2012. The Instituto Camões exercises institutional autonomy, under the supervision of the Portuguese Ministry of Foreign Affairs, with the role of co-ordination and execution of external cultural policies of the Portuguese Government.

== History ==
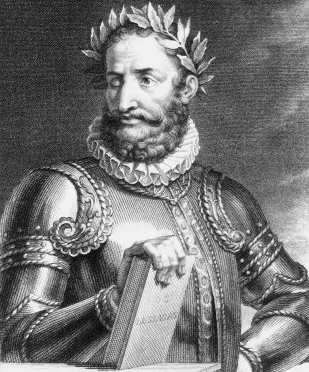
Luís Vaz de Camões.

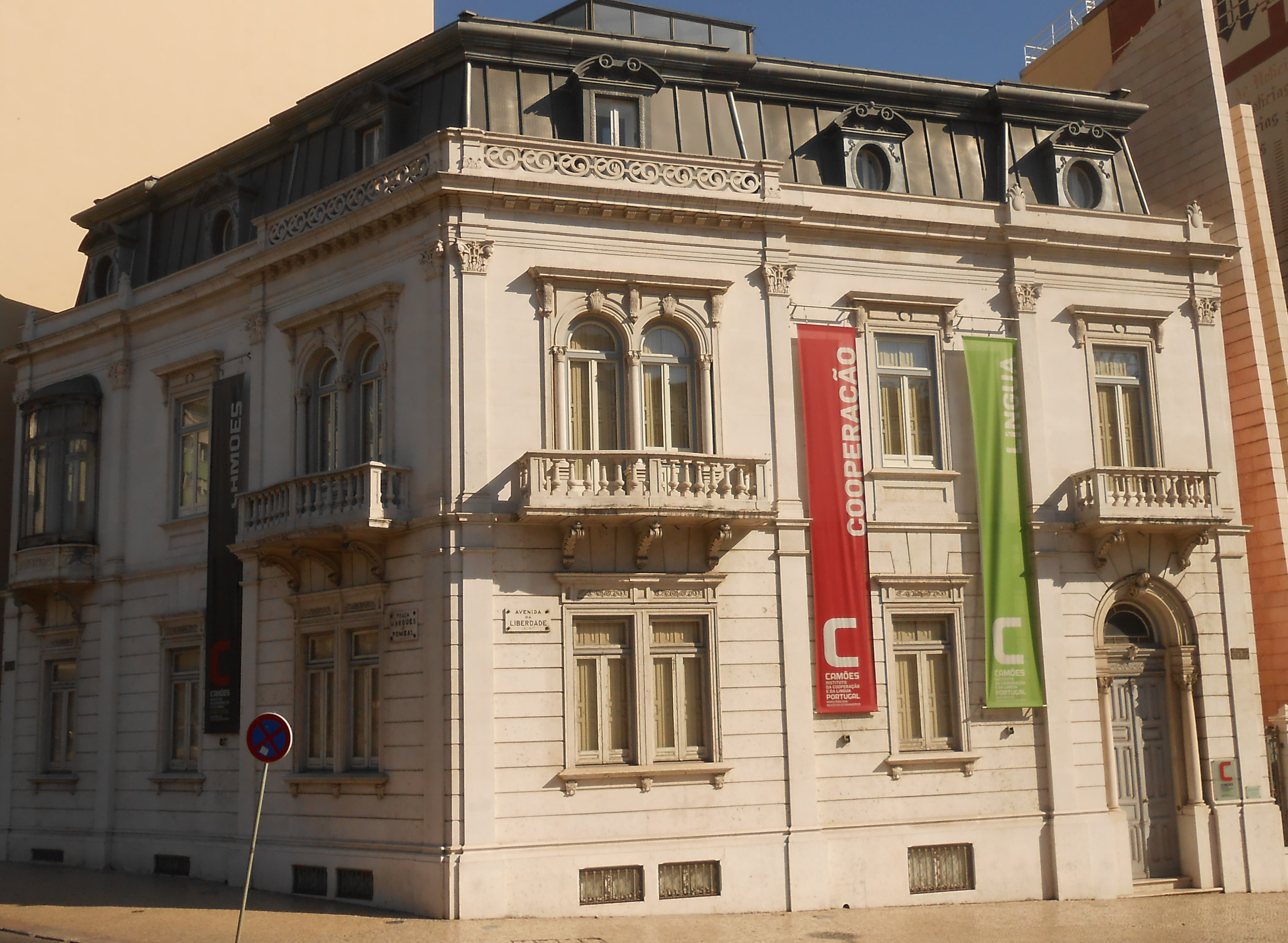
The Instituto Camões head office in Seixas Palace, on the Avenida da Liberdade in Lisbon, Portugal.

The Instituto Camões was named in honour of Luís de Camões, a poet of the Portuguese Renaissance and author of Os Lusíadas, considered to be the national epic of Portugal and the Portuguese language. The Instituto Camões head office is headquartered at Seixas Palace, a 19th-century mansion on Marquis of Pombal Square, in Lisbon, Portugal.

The institution has its roots in the Junta da Educação Nacional, founded in 1924 to grant scholarships, funds, and grants to foreign universities and institutions that promoted Portuguese language education.

In 1936, the institution's role was expanded to include the promotion of Portuguese culture and arts, as the Institute for High Culture (Instituto para a Alta Cultura). The institution was briefly named the Institute of Portuguese Culture (Instituto de Cultura Portuguesa), from 1976 to 1980.

In 1980, the institution's mission was refocused on language and renamed the Institute of Portuguese Culture and Language (Instituto de Cultura e Língua Portuguesa). The institution took its current name, after the Portuguese Renaissance author Luís Vaz de Camões, in 1992.

In 2005, the Instituto Camões received the Prince of Asturias Award for outstanding achievements in communications and the humanities, alongside the UK's British Council, Germany's Goethe-Institut, France's Alliance française, Spain's Instituto Cervantes, and Italy's Società Dante Alighieri.

In 2012, the Instituto Camões absorbed the Portuguese Institute for Development Support, the development aid agency of the Government of Portugal. Since then, Instituto Camões operates with a wider mission of promoting Portuguese language, culture, and aid across the world.

== Structure ==
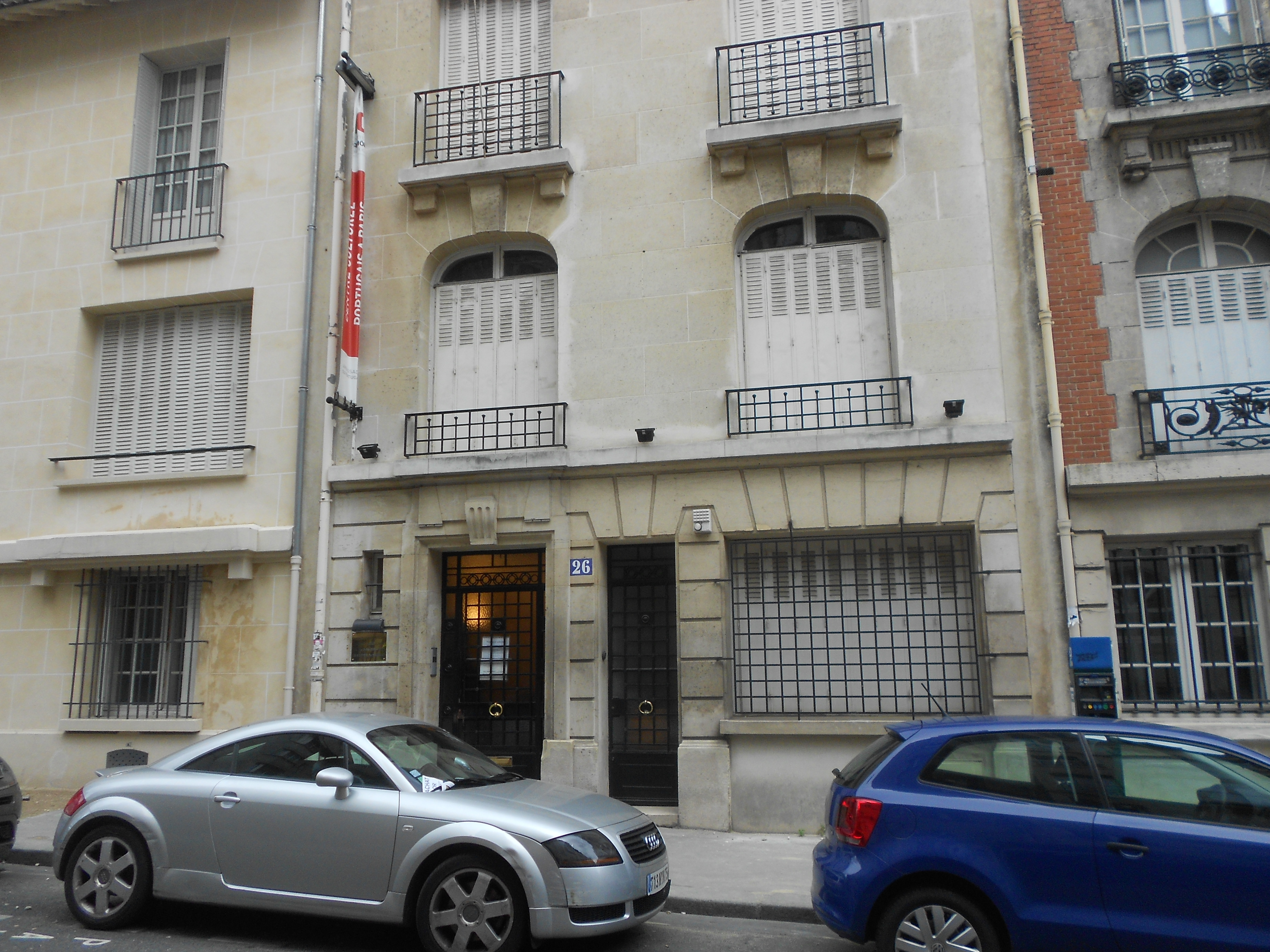
Portuguese Cultural Center in Paris.

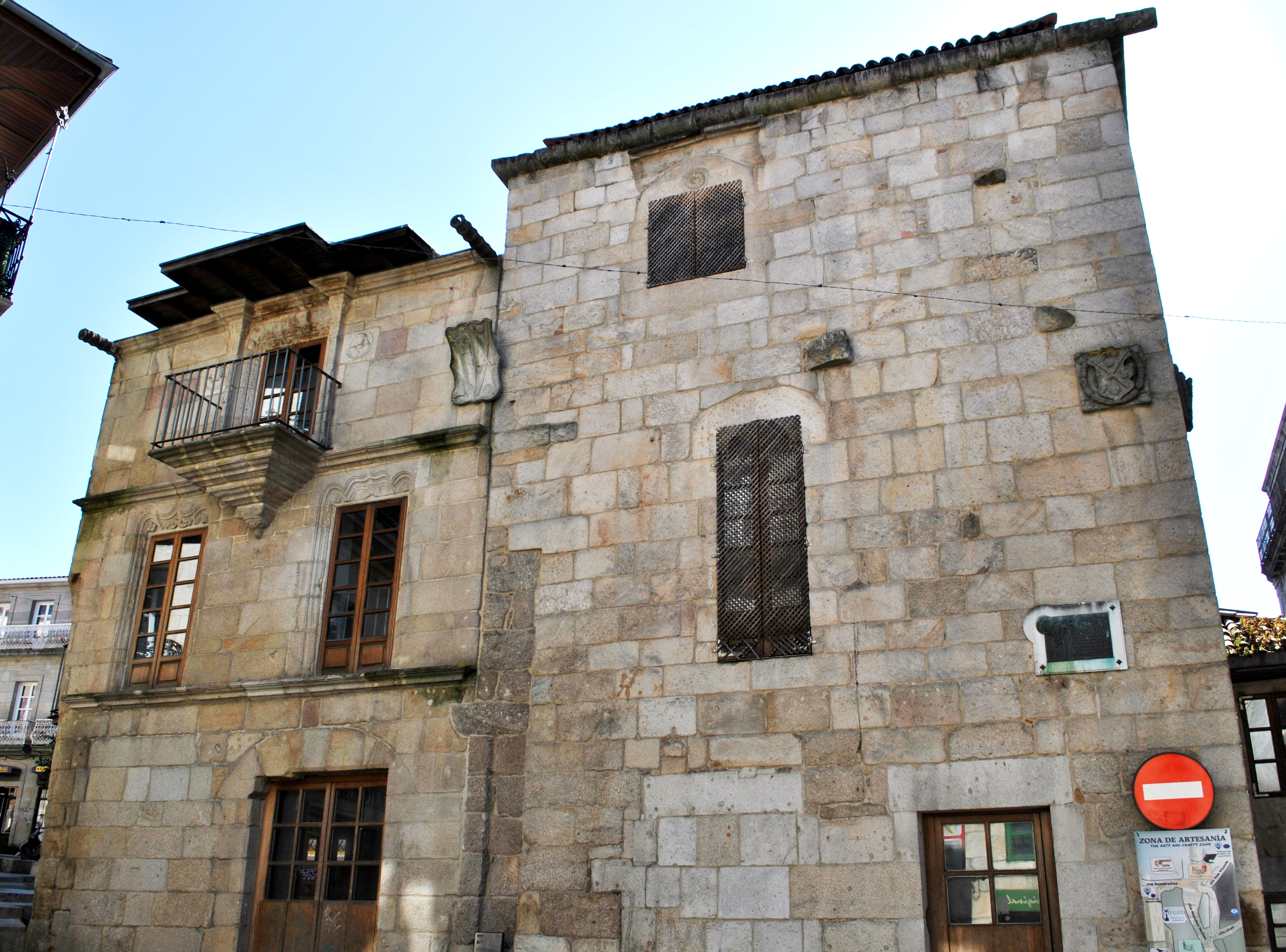
A Portuguese Cultural & Language Center in Vigo, Galicia, Spain.

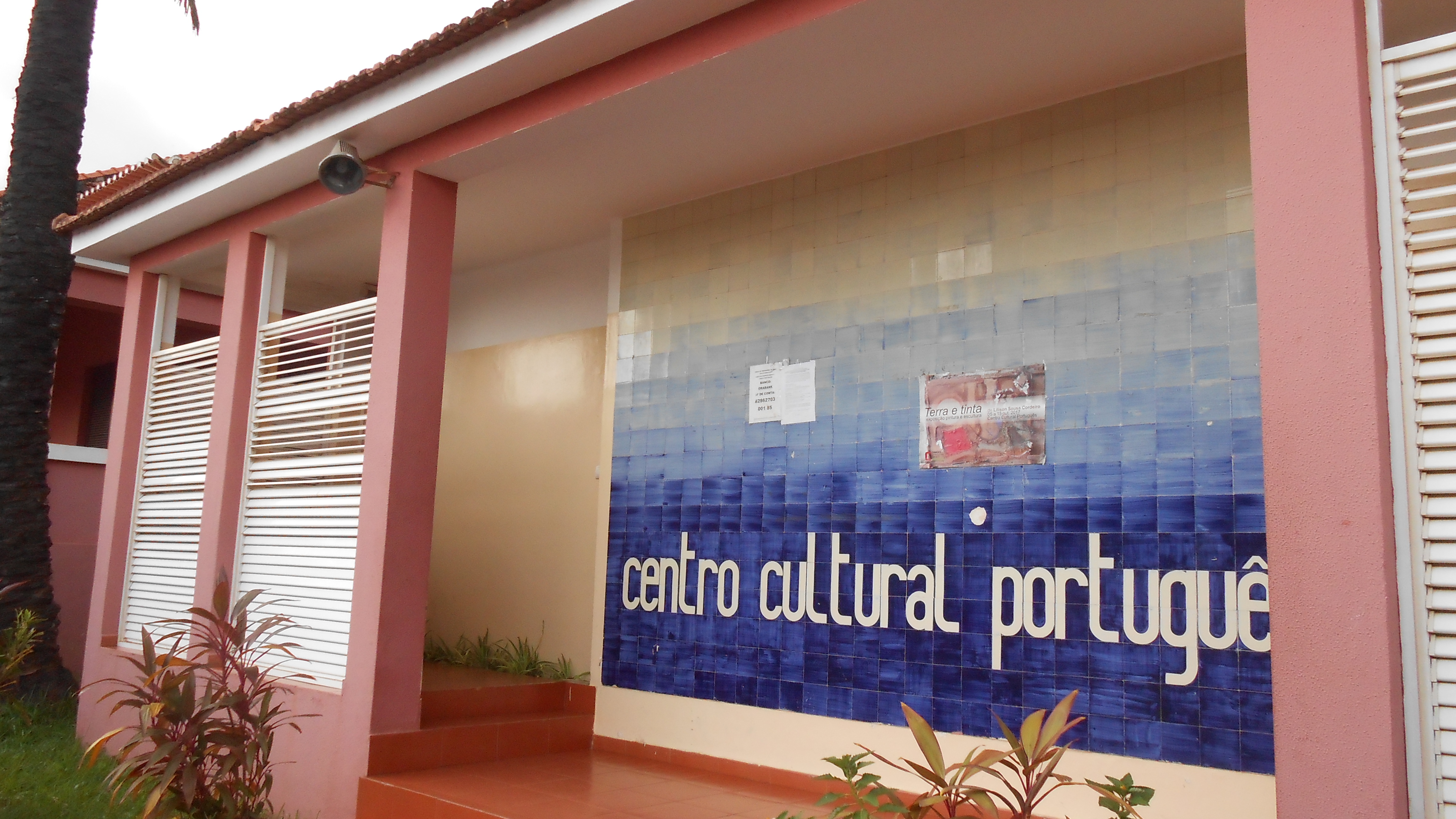
A Portuguese Cultural Center in Bissau, capital of Guinea-Bissau.

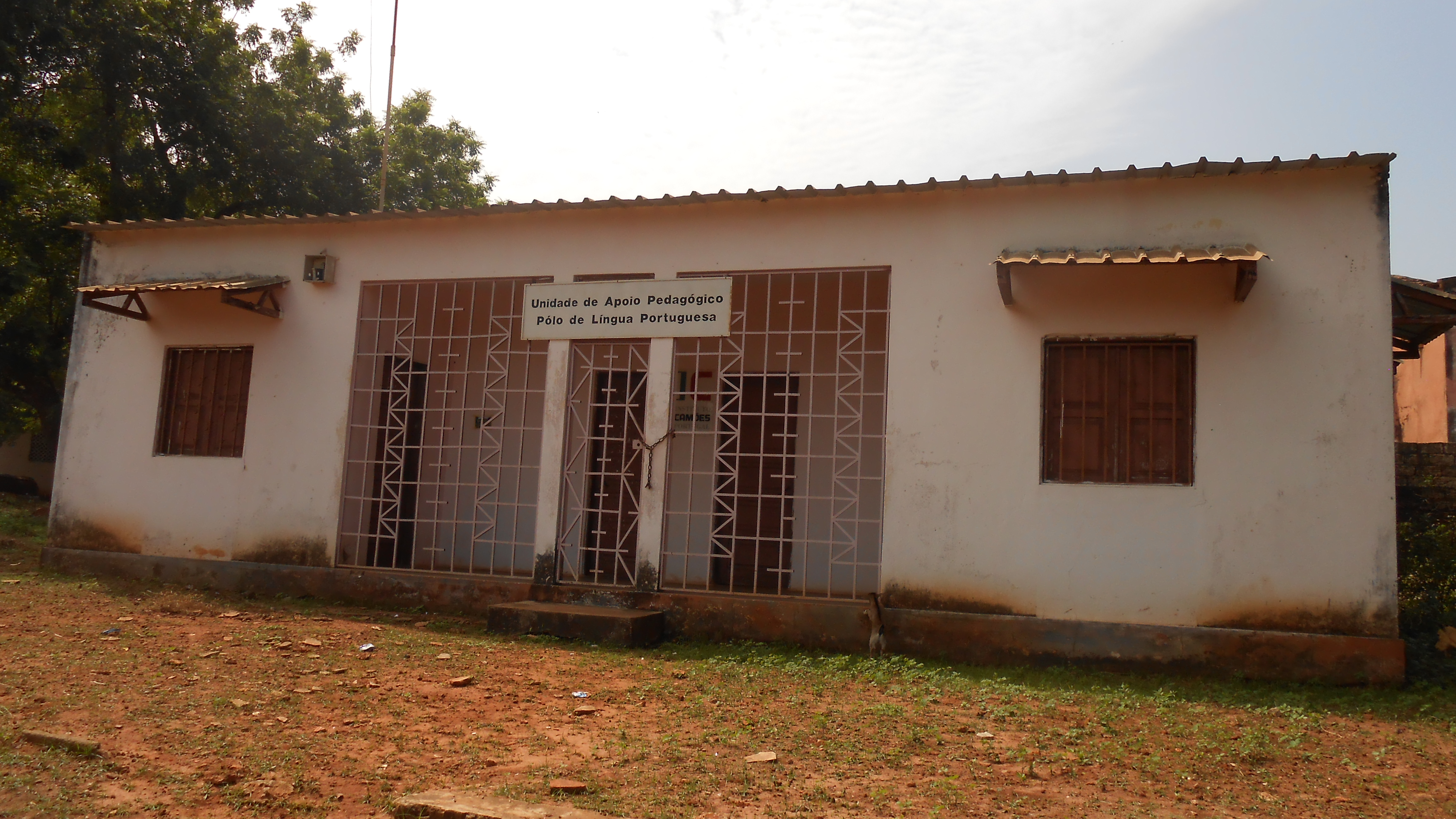
A Portuguese Language Center in Bolama, in the Bijagós Islands.

=== Portuguese Language Centers ===
The Institute's Portuguese Language Centres (Centros de Língua Portuguesa or CLP) aim to promote the Portuguese language as well as co-operation with different countries in the field of education, including those where Portuguese is already spoken. This is in contrast to Spain's Instituto Cervantes, which is represented only in non-Spanish-speaking countries.

New centres are presently [when?] being established in Paris and in the headquarters of the African Union in Addis Ababa and of the Economic Community of West African States in Abuja and in 2005, the towns of Canchungo, Ongoré, Mansôa, Bafatá, Gabú, Buba, Catió, Bolama, Bubaque, and Quinhamel in Guinea-Bissau to spread the fluency of Portuguese as the official language in the country.

Angola: Benguela, Lubango, and Luanda; Argentina: Buenos Aires; Austria: Vienna; Belgium: Antwerp; Brazil: São Paulo and Brasília; Canada: Toronto (Cape Verde) Cabo Verde: Praia; China: Beijing, Shanghai and (Macau) Macao (as Instituto Português do Oriente); Croatia: Zagreb; Czech Republic: Prague; Estonia: Tallinn; Ethiopia: Addis Ababa; France: Lille, Lyon, and Poitiers; Germany: Hamburg; Guinea-Bissau: Bissau; Hungary: Budapest; India: Goa (as Instituto Português do Oriente); Italy: Florence and Milan; Mexico: Mexico City; Moldova: Chișinău; Morocco: Casablanca, Rabat	Mozambique: Beira, Lichinga, Maputo, Nampula, Quelimane, and Xai-Xai; Namibia: Windhoek; Poland: Lublin; Romania: Bucharest, Cluj-Napoca, and Constanta; São Tomé and Príncipe: São Tomé; Senegal: Dakar; Serbia: Belgrade; South Africa: Johannesburg; South Korea: Pusan (as Instituto Português do Oriente); Spain: Barcelona, Madrid, Cáceres, and Vigo; Sweden: Stockholm; Timor-Leste: Dili (as Instituto Português do Oriente); Tunisia: Tunis; United Kingdom: London, Edinburgh, Leeds, Newcastle and Oxford; United States: Boston, Newark, and San Diego; Venezuela: Caracas

=== Portuguese Cultural Centres ===
The Institute's Portuguese cultural centres (Centros culturais portugueses) are centres whose aim is the promotion of cultural relations between Portugal and other countries, including those with which Portugal has strong historical and cultural ties, and where Portuguese is already widely spoken. Like in language centres' counterparts, this is in contrast to Spain's Instituto Cervantes, which is only represented in non-Spanish-speaking countries.

Angola (Luanda); Brazil (Brasília); Cape Verde (Praia, Mindelo); China (Beijing); France (Paris); Germany (Berlin); Guinea-Bissau (Bissau); India (New Delhi)	Japan (Tokyo); Luxembourg (Luxembourg); Morocco (Rabat); Mozambique (Maputo, Beira); São Tomé and Príncipe (São Tomé, Santo António); Spain (Vigo); Thailand (Bangkok); Timor-Leste (Dili)

== See also ==
- Portuguese language
- Portuguese literature
- Portuguese poetry
- Lusophone
- Lusitanic
- Music of Portugal
- Lusophone music
- Portuguese cuisine
- Lusophony Games
- Culture of Portugal
- Architecture of Portugal
- Community of Portuguese Language Countries
- Geographic distribution of the Portuguese language
- List of countries where Portuguese is an official language
- List of international organisations which have Portuguese as an official language
- Portuguese-speaking African countries (PALOP)
- International Association of Portuguese-Speaking Communications
