= Yunus Emre Institute =

Turkish global non-profit organization

- Yunus Emre Enstitüsü
- Named after: Yunus Emre
- Founded: 2007; 19 years ago
- Founder: Government of Turkey
- Type: Cultural institution
- Headquarters: Ankara, Turkey
- Region served: Worldwide
- Product: Turkish cultural education
- Leader: Abdurrahman Aliy (President)
- Website: www.yee.org.tr
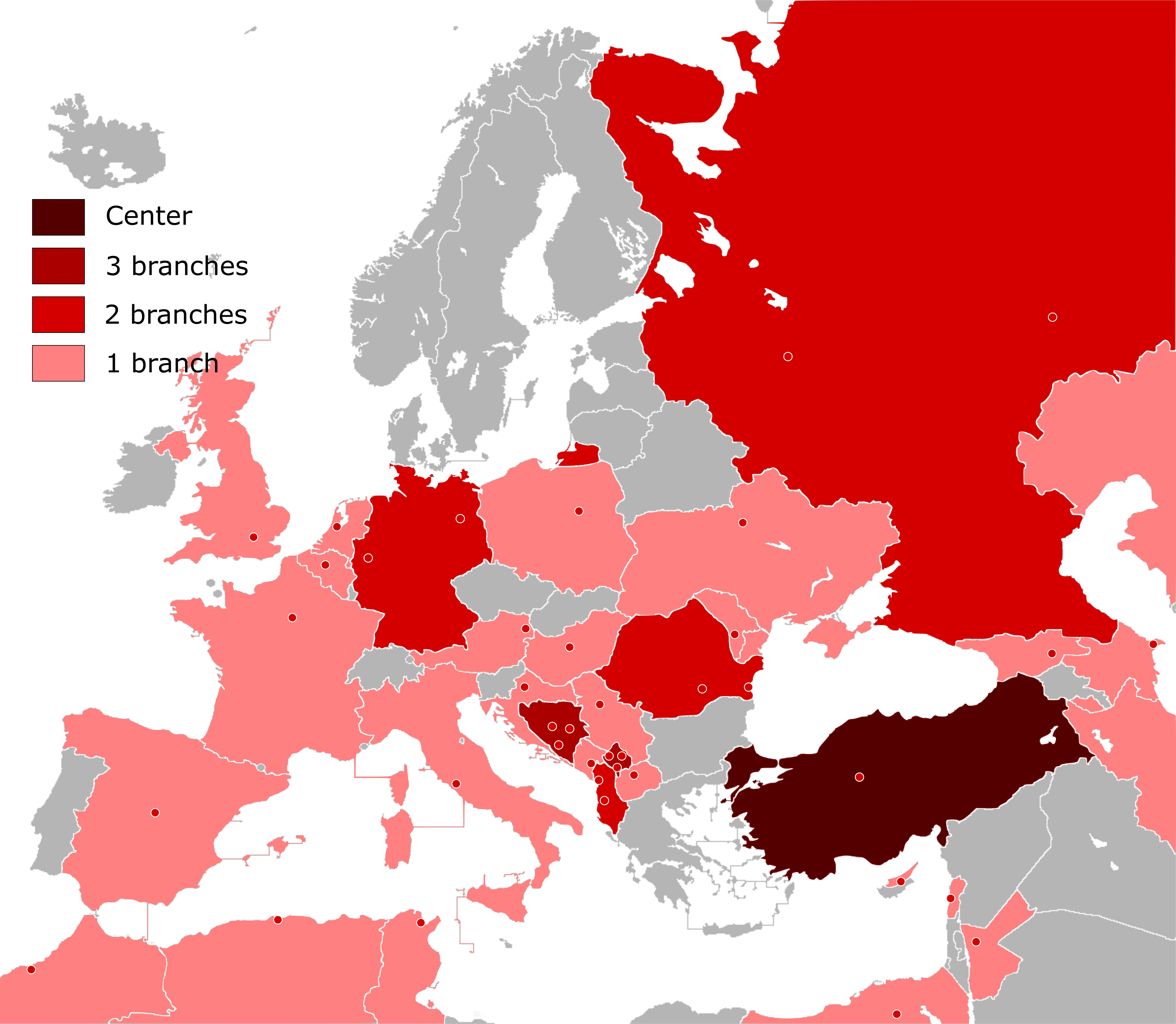
- Map showing the distribution of Yunus Emre Institute branches in and around Europe, as of 2015.

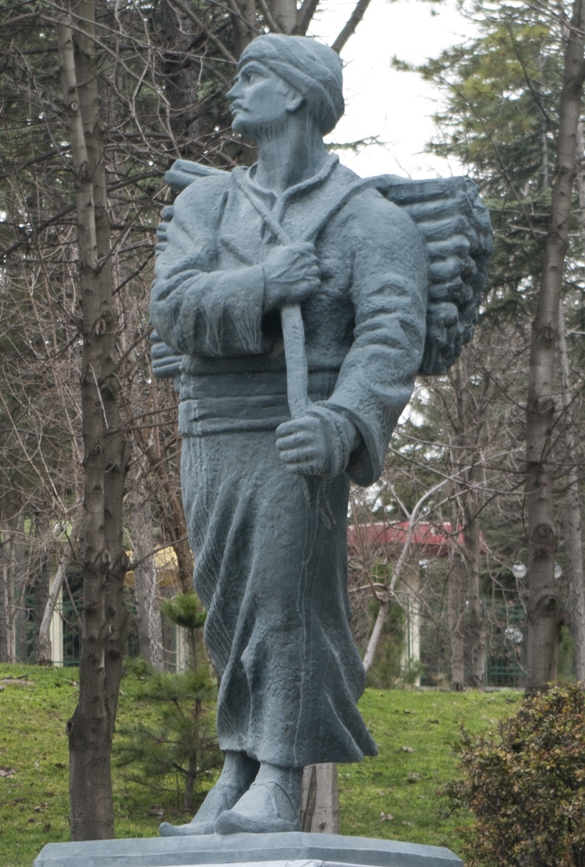
Statue of Yunus Emre, Turkish poet and the institute's namesake

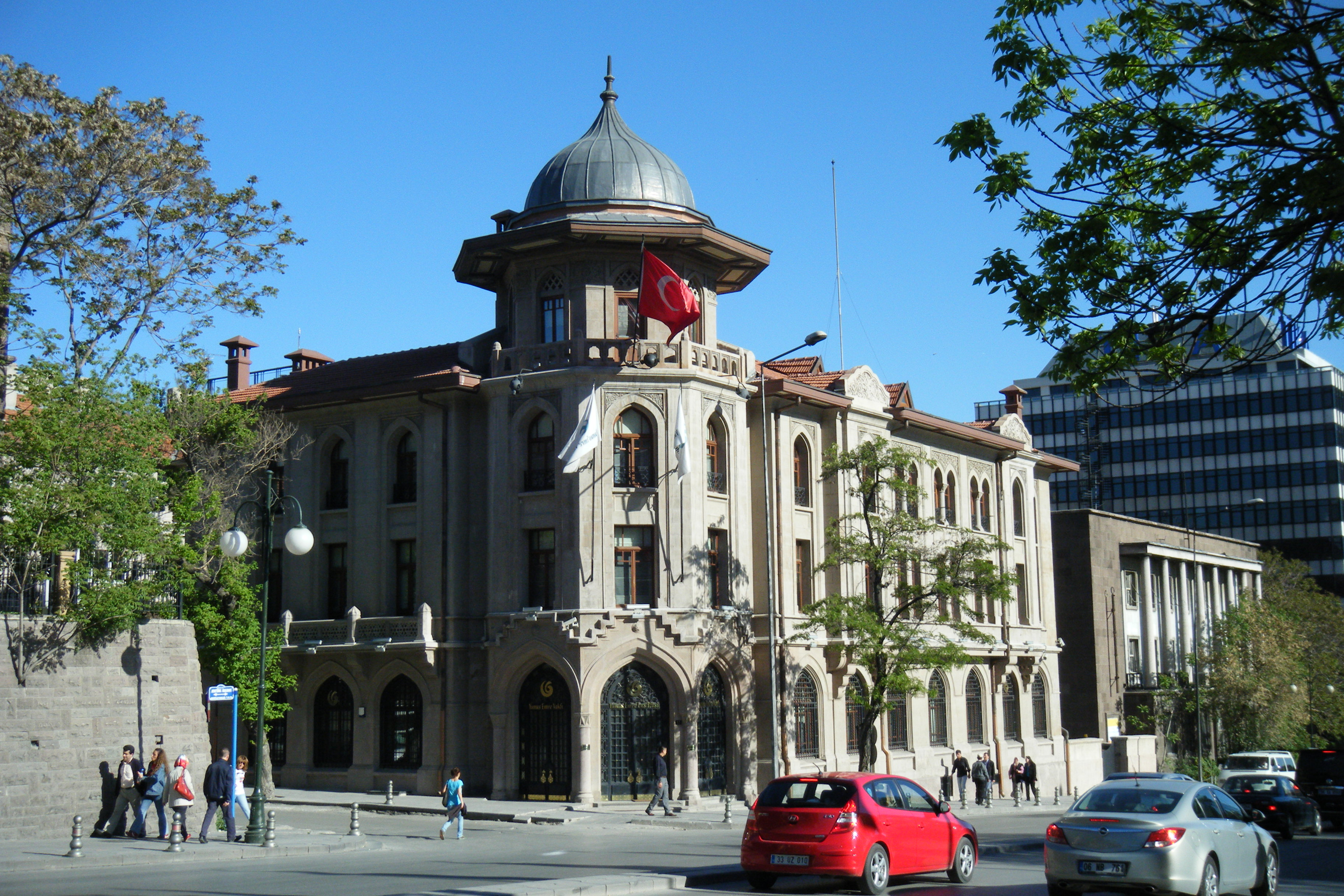
Yunus Emre Institute in Ankara

Yunus Emre Institute (Turkish: Yunus Emre Enstitüsü) is a world-wide non-profit organization created by the Turkish government in 2007. Named after the famous 14th-century poet Yunus Emre, it aims to promote the Turkish language and the culture around the world. It has been regarded as a Turkish soft power institution and was founded by the Presidency under Recep Tayyip Erdoğan. The activities, branching, and networking of the institute have most intensely been centered in and around the Balkans region.

== History ==
Yunus Emre Institute was founded in 2007 under the Presidency of Recep Tayyip Erdoğan. It is funded through public resources. The first diplomacy center was established in 2009 in Sarajevo. In 2023, its budget was 1.3 billion Turkish liras.

In July 2024, former president Şeref Ateş and 17 other personnel were dismissed under charges of embezzlement and fraud. Warrants went out for their arrest, and all but Ateş were found and detained. It is believed that Ateş fled to Germany. The new president is Abdurrahman Aliy.

== Programming ==
=== Artificial intelligence platform ===
One of Yunus Emre Institute's goals is to promote knowledge of the Turkish language. In 2026, the institute plans to publish an Artificial Intelligence-based platform to teach Turkish. According to Yunus Emre President Abdurrahman Aliy, “This will be one of the world’s most comprehensive online language-learning platforms. A person with no prior Turkish knowledge will be able to reach an advanced level through this system, guided by AI like a personal instructor."

=== Cultural programming ===
They have hosted numerous art and cultural exhibits that relate to Turkish and broader Middle Eastern culture. In February 2026, Yunus Emre Institue hosted a Turkish-Nigerian poetry gathering to promote cooperation between the two countries and strengthen cultural ties. Other examples of cultural programming include exhibits on traditional Anatolian bridal gowns, Turkish history, and Turkey's National Children's Day. In 2024, it was estimated that Yunus Emre Institue hosted over 1,000 cultural events worldwide.

=== Turkology Project ===
The Turkology Project supports academic Turkology departments around the world. It aims to train specialists to promote Turkish language and culture.

== Locations ==
The Yunus Emre Institute operates 93 cultural centers across 69 countries as of 2025, reaching approximately 26,000 Turkish language learners.

=== Expansion ===
In 2026, Yunus Emre institute plans to expand more into South America and Africa. The popularity of Turkish television series in Latin America has already promoted cultural ties between the two regions, according to Yunus Emre President Abdurrahman Aliy.

A Yunus Emre branch may be opened in Ashgabat in coming years.

=== List of locations worldwide ===
- Turkey – Ankara
- Albania – Tirana
- Albania – Shkodër
- Kosovo – Pristina
- Kosovo – Prizren
- Kosovo – Peja
- Afghanistan – Kabul
- Algeria – Algiers
- Argentina – Buenos Aires
- Australia – Melbourne
- Austria – Vienna
- Azerbaijan – Baku
- Bahrain – Manama
- Belgium – Brussels
- Bosnia and Herzegovina – Fojnica
- Bosnia and Herzegovina – Mostar
- Bosnia and Herzegovina – Sarajevo
- Canada – Toronto
- China – Beijing
- Croatia – Zagreb
- Turkish Republic of Northern Cyprus – Nicosia
- Egypt – Cairo
- United Kingdom – London
- France – Paris
- Georgia – Tbilisi
- Germany – Berlin
- Germany – Cologne
- Hungary – Budapest
- Indonesia – Jakarta
- Iran – Tehran
- Ireland – Dublin
- Italy – Rome
- Japan – Tokyo
- Jordan – Amman
- Kazakhstan – Astana
- Lebanon – Beirut
- North Macedonia – Skopje
- Malaysia – Kuala Lumpur
- Mexico – Mexico City
- Moldova – Comrat
- Montenegro – Podgorica
- Morocco – Rabat
- Netherlands – Amsterdam
- Nigeria – Abuja
- Pakistan – Karachi
- Pakistan – Lahore
- Palestine – East Jerusalem
- Palestine – Ramallah
- Poland – Warsaw
- Qatar – Doha
- Romania – Bucharest
- Romania – Constanța
- Russia – Moscow
- Russia – Kazan
- Rwanda – Kigali
- Senegal – Dakar
- Serbia – Belgrade
- Somalia – Mogadishu
- South Africa – Johannesburg
- South Korea – Seoul
- Spain – Madrid
- Sudan – Khartoum
- Syria – Azaz
- Tunisia – Tunis
- Ukraine – Kyiv
- United States – Washington, D.C.

== See also ==
- Foreign relations of Turkey
- Turkish language
