= Portuguese Institute for Development Support =

The Portuguese Institute for Development Support logo

The Portuguese Institute for Development Support (Portuguese: Instituto Português de Apoio ao Desenvolvimento, IPAD) is a development aid agency under the Portuguese Ministry for Foreign Affairs. Since January 2003, the institute is responsible for Portuguese official development assistance to developing countries.

The institute focus on the Portuguese-speaking African countries (Angola, Cape Verde, Guinea-Bissau, Mozambique and São Tomé and Príncipe, known in Portuguese by the acronym PALOP) and East Timor. In 2009 these countries absorbed 66% of the bilateral aid disbursed by IPAD (131 million euros). The same year, the institute disbursed a total of approximately 368 million euros in bilateral and multilateral aid. According to the OECD, Portugal’s total ODA (USD 504.7 million, preliminary data) increased in 2022 due to an increase in budget support to African countries, humanitarian aid to Ukraine and multilateral aid, and represented 0.23% of gross national income (GNI).

Find the methodological notes behind the profile here.

Policy In 2012, IPAD was merged with Camões Institute to form Camões - the Institute of Cooperation and Language (Camões I.P.).
