= Cultural institution =

Organization promoting cultural heritage

A cultural institution or cultural organization is an organization within a culture or subculture that works for the preservation or promotion of culture. The term is especially used for public and charitable organizations, but its range of meaning can be very broad. Examples of cultural institutions in modern society are museums, libraries, archives, churches, art galleries, theaters, concert halls and opera houses.

== List of national institutions ==
European institutions:

- (France) Alliance française
- (United Kingdom) British Council
- (Italy) Dante Alighieri Society
- (Germany) Goethe-Institut
- (Portugal) Instituto Camões
- (Spain) Instituto Cervantes
- (Hungary) Liszt Institute (previously Balassi Institute)
- (Switzerland) Pro Helvetia
- (Turkey) Yunus Emre Institute

== See also ==
- Art world
- GLAM (cultural heritage)
- Cultural heritage
