= Viva Festival =

UK film festival

Viva festival logo

¡Viva! Spanish and Latin American Film Festival is an annual festival, established in 1995, that is dedicated to the promotion and appreciation of Spanish and Latin American cinema. It takes place at HOME, Manchester (2015 onward), having previously taken place at Cornerhouse, Manchester (1995 - 2015).

¡Viva! is the only UK festival dedicated to the promotion of Spanish and Latin American cinema. The festival used to focus only on Spanish cinema, but in the mid-2000's it expanded to Latin America as well. It is produced by HOME (previously Cornerhouse) in partnership with Manchester’s Instituto Cervantes and with The University of Manchester and Manchester Metropolitan University.

It presents a wide range of Spanish language films from across the globe. The week-long festival is also committed to the teaching of Spanish and Latin American culture, and offers study sessions and engagement events for the general public, GCSE and A-Level students and teachers.

Throughout the years, ¡Viva! has presented a variety of new and independent films, as well as a selection of older productions. Directors and actors have attended to show and discuss their work, including Bigas Luna, Julio Medem, Carlos Sorín, Icíar Bollaín, and Gabriel Nesci amongst others.

In January 2015, it was announced that ¡Viva! would be adopting a new format for the 2015 festival, taking place over three separate weekends throughout the year, to form part of the opening program of HOME, Manchester’s International Centre for Contemporary Visual Art, Film and Theatre that is the result of a merger between Cornerhouse and Manchester’s Library Theatre Company. The first ‘¡Viva! Weekender’ in March 2015 was the last ¡Viva! event to be held at Cornerhouse – all future events related to the festival, including two further ‘Weekenders’ in June and November 2015, focusing on Mexico and Spain respectively, were held at HOME, with the festival returning to its traditional week-long format from 2016.

The ¡Viva! lineup focuses on films that do not make it into regular cinemas, especially in the UK. The titles are chosen from film festivals around the world including Cannes, Berlin and Toronto, among others. The festival does not have open-calls, but does have an extensive network of producers, filmmakers and their friends who might assist the programming team in possible additions to the festival.

The programming team consists of Rachel Hayward (HOME’s Head of Film Strategy), Jessie Gibbs (¡Viva! Festival Coordinator), wo have both worked at the festival since 2005, and Andy Willis from the University of Salford (HOME’s Senior Visiting Curator: Film).
