= Hayran (vocal style) =

Kurdish vocal style

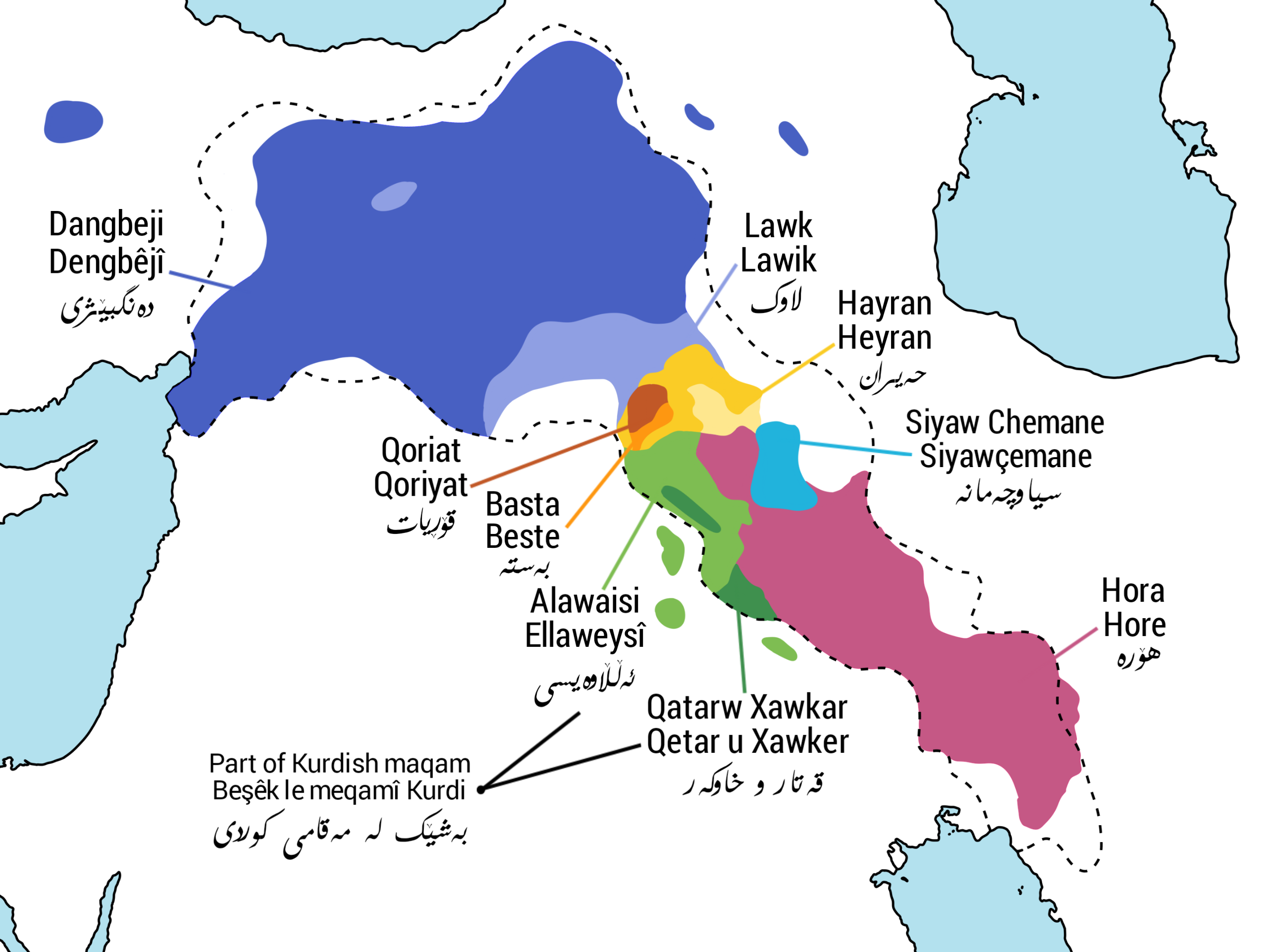
An ethnomusicological map showing the regional distribution of Kurdish traditional vocal styles.

Hayran (Kurdish: حەیران, romanized: Ĥeyran, Kurdish pronunciation: [ħɛjˈɾɑːn]) is a form of Kurdish vocal music, performed without instrumental accompaniment, though sometimes with music; It typically consists of several short lyrical verses. The singer of a hayran often addresses personal experiences, such as the hardships of life or expressions of love. In many cases, the performer may also use third-person narrative to recount an impactful story or a significant historical event.

Hayran is a type of poetic expression.

== Etymology ==
The word hayran means "lover", "longing one", "enamored", or "enchanted". According to the Kurdistan Dictionary, the term refers to one of the oldest forms of Kurdish songs.

== History ==
Hayran performed by Hassan Zirak.

The origins of hayran are generally traced back to the ancient civilizations of Mesopotamia. However, some accounts suggest that hayran may have developed during the feudal period, as it was reportedly favored by local nobility (Aghas).

The main region associated with the emergence and development of hayran is the plains of Hewlêr (Erbil). It later spread from Hewlêr to other regions of Kurdistan.

== Types ==
Hayran can be categorized into two primary musical forms: Serçiyayî (Kurdish: سەرچیایی) and Mecilîsî (Kurdish: مەجلیسی). Each type has distinct stylistic and performative characteristics that reflect the context in which it is traditionally performed.

=== Serçiyayî ===
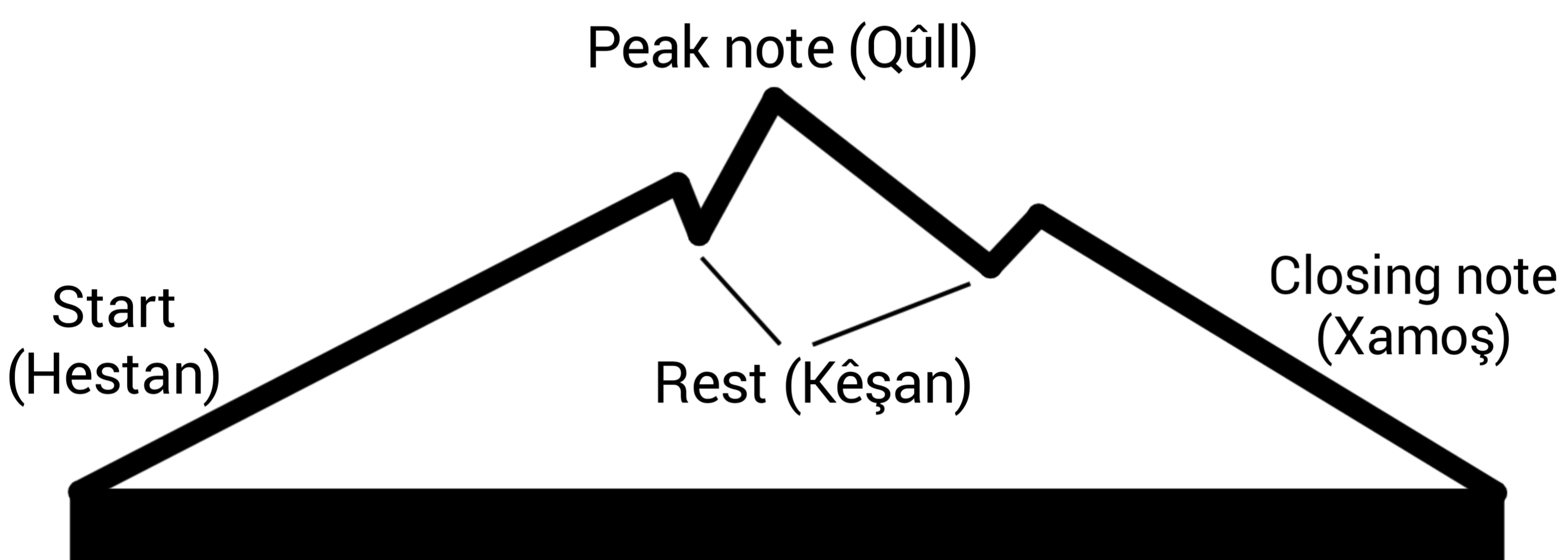
Illustration of the Serçiyayî style of hayran

Serçiyayî is a type of hayran that is sung in a loud voice. The vocalist's voice must have a high range and maintain a strong projection throughout the performance. During the performance, the volume of the voice gradually increases.

=== Mecilîsî ===
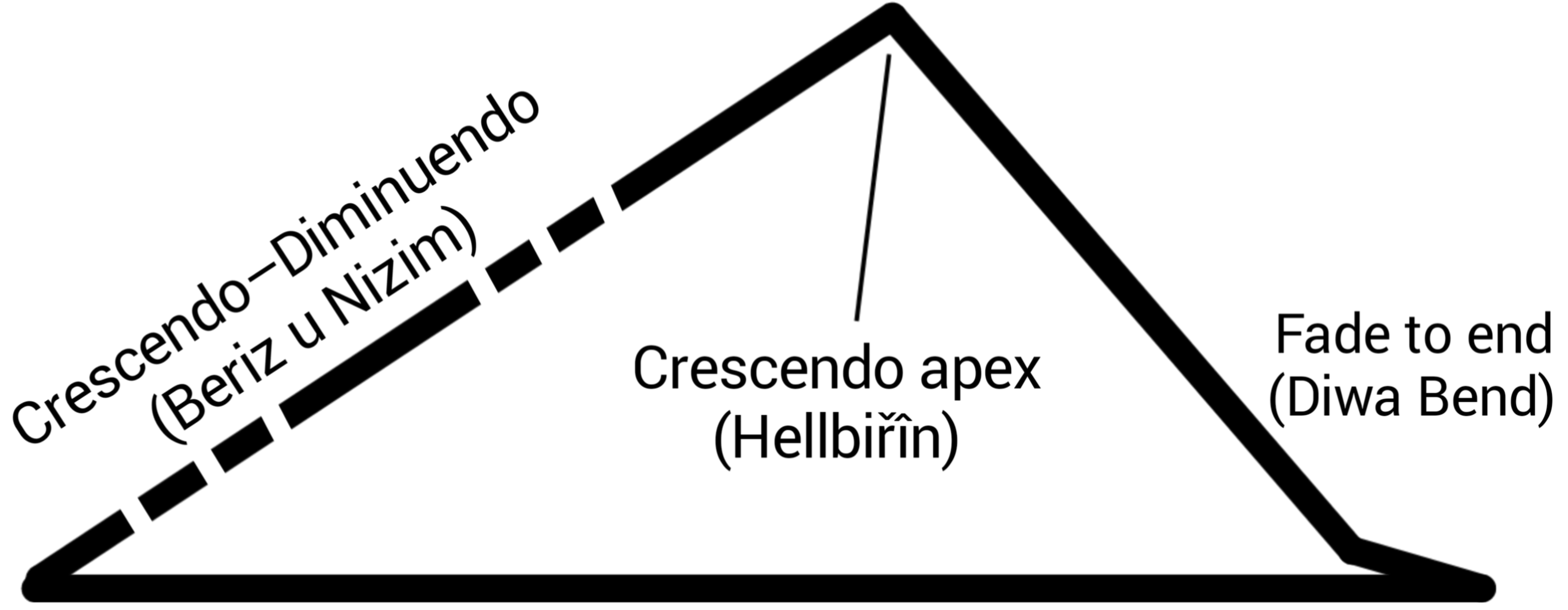
Illustration of the Mecilîsî style of hayran

Mecilîsî is a type of hayran traditionally performed in teahouses and local gatherings. It is characterized by a spontaneous delivery, using a low and quiet voice. This style does not require strong vocal projection or intense vocal effort, which makes it accessible to a wide range of singers.

If a hayran consists of fewer than three rhyme units, Serbend, Nawbend, and Duabend, it is considered incomplete and is not regarded as a true hayran.

== Notable performers ==
The following individuals are known for their contributions to the performance and preservation of hayran:

- Xidir Girdgirawî
- Seyd Badaweyi
- Cemîl 'Elyaweyi
- Nadir Siyan
- 'Umer Gawereyi
- Ĥesen Sîsaweyî
- 'Ereb 'Usman
- Řesûll Gerdi
- Ĥesen Ĥeyran

== See also ==
- Dengbêj
- List of music genres and styles

== Sources ==
- Mexmuri, Xefur (2001). Heyran, çemik, naweřok, serhelldan [Hayran, concept, content, origin] (in Kurdish). Erbil, Kurdistan Region: Aras Publisher (published 2004).
- Sincawî, Cemîl (2010). Heyran u Çend Boçûnêkî tir (PDF) (in Kurdish). Erbil, Kurdistan Region: Senterî Řoşinbîrî u Hûnerî Qereçûx.
