= Barak Baba =

Turkoman dervish (1257–1307)

Barak Baba (Persian: براق بابا; 1257–1307) was a Turkoman dervish.

He was born in a village near Tokat. His father came from an affluent background. Legendary narratives identify him as the Seljuk Sultan of Rum Kaykaus II (r. 1246–62), who took refuge in the Byzantine Empire, while his son was adopted by the patriarch in Constantinople and subsequently converted to Christianity. He was restored to his Islamic origins by dervish Sarı Saltık, who honored him as Barak ("hairless dog" in Kipchak languages) after he eagerly swallowed Sarı Saltık's spit.

== Bibliography ==
- Algar, H. (1988). "Barāq Bābā". In Yarshater, Ehsan (ed.). Encyclopædia Iranica. Vol. III/7: Banān–Bardesanes. London and New York: Routledge & Kegan Paul. pp. 754–755. ISBN 978-0-71009-119-2.
- Ocak, Ahmet Yaşar (1992). "Barak Baba". TDV Encyclopedia of Islam, Vol. 5 (Balaban – Beşi̇r Ağa) (in Turkish). Istanbul: Turkiye Diyanet Foundation, Centre for Islamic Studies. pp. 61–62. ISBN 978-975-389-432-6.
