= Dante Alighieri Society =

Italian organization

Società Dante Alighieri
- Founded: 1889; 137 years ago
- Founder: Ernesto Nathan
- Type: Cultural institution
- Location: Rome
- Region served: Worldwide
- Product: Italian cultural and language education
- Key people: Andrea Riccardi (President)
- Website: www.ladante.it

The Dante Alighieri Society (Italian: Società Dante Alighieri) is a society that promotes Italian culture and language around the world. Today this society is present in more than 60 countries.

It was formed in Italy in July 1889. The society was named after Dante Alighieri (1265–1321), a pre-Renaissance poet from Florence and the author of The Divine Comedy. Dante is considered the father of the Italian language.

In October 1948 the society was restructured at a meeting in Venice to give total autonomy to all chapters of the Dante Society so that each could conduct its activities independently, under the direction of its own elected officers, in a manner that best suited local needs, preferences, and capacities while adhering to the Society's basic principles.

In July 2019 at the International Congress in Buenos Aires, the Società Dante Alighieri adopted a new statute stating that “the foreign committees are subject to the regulations dictated by their own legislation” and that in each committee’s “Constitution must be clear reference to the inspiring principles of the Società Dante Alighieri, the sharing of its aims and objectives and the need to sign the Convenzione di Affiliazione that governs the relationship between the Società Dante Alighieri and the committees.”

== The cultural role of Dante Alighieri ==
The sole purpose of the Dante Alighieri Society is to "promote the study of the Italian language and culture throughout the world... a purpose independent of political ideologies, national or ethnic origins or religious beliefs, and that the Society is the free association of people – not just Italians – but all people everywhere who are united by their love for the Italian languages and culture and the spirit of universal humanism that these represent."

The society operates throughout the world, with branches from the United States to Australia. Many societies offer language courses, ranging from tourist and beginner's Italian to advanced courses in addition to their cultural activities. Some of them are recognized as Centro d'esame autorizzato PLIDA - the Italian Certification Exam offered by Società Dante Alighieri.

In 2005, the Dante Alighieri Society (along with the Alliance française, British Council, Goethe-Institut, Instituto Cervantes, and Instituto Camões) was awarded the Prince of Asturias Award for Communications and Humanities.

In 2021, to mark the 700th anniversary of Dante Alighieri's death, the Società Dante Alighieri launched Dante.global, an online platform for the Italian language and culture. The digital platform aims to promote the Italian language and culture globally.

== Recognition ==
In 2005 Dante Alighieri Society was awarded the Prince of Asturias Award along with the Alliance française, the British Council, the Goethe-Institut, the Instituto Cervantes, and the Instituto Camões.

== See also ==
- Dante Society of America
- Istituto Italiano di Cultura
