= List of Turkic-languages poets =

This is a list of poets writing in Turkic languages.

== 11th–12th century ==
- Mahmud al-Kashgari, poet (1005–1102)
- Yusuf Balasaguni, poet (1019–1085)
- Ahmad Yasawi, poet, mystic (1093–1166)
- Arslan Baba, poet, mystic

== 13th–14th century ==
- Mahmud Qırımlı, first attested Crimean Tatar poet (c. 1200)
- Yunus Emre, poet, mystic and Dervish Sufi (1240–1320)
- Izzeddin "Hasanoglu" Esfaryani, poet, (13th - 14th centuries)
- Köroğlu, a poet of the ashik tradition
- Kaygusuz Abdal, Alevi folk poet, (1341–1444)
- Kadi Burhan al-Din, (1345–1398)
- Imadaddin Nasimi, (1369–1417)

== 15th–16th century ==
- Ali-Shir Nava'i, poet (1441–1501)
- Pir Sultan Abdal (1480–1550)
- Khatai, (1487–1524)
- Gül Baba, (d. 1541)
- Muhibbi, (1494–1566)
- Fuzûlî, poet (1483–1556)
- Babur, poet and leader (1483–1530)
- Bâkî, poet (1526–1600)

== 17th–18th–19th century ==
- Karacaoğlan (c. 1606-c. 1680)
- Ashik Umer (1621–1707), Crimean Tatar poet-ashik
- Yusuf Nabi (1642–1712)
- Magtymguly Pyragy (1724–1807), Turkmen poet, songwriter and intellectual
- Kul Nesîmî (17th century), Alevi-Bektashi poet
- Nedîm (c. 1681–1730)
- Bukhar-zhirau Kalmakanov, poet (1693–1789)
- Molla Vali Vidadi, ashik (1709–1809)
- Salawat Yulayev (1754–1800), Bashkir poet
- Erzurumlu Emrah, poet (1775–1854)
- Dadaloğlu, (c. 1785–c. 1868)
- Ashig Alasgar, ashik (1821–1926)
- Miftahetdin Akmulla (1831-1895), Bashkir, Kazakh and Tatar poet
- Abay Qunanbayuli, (1845–1904), poet, composer and philosopher
- Abdulkadir Inan (1889-1976)
- Zeki Velidi Togan (1890-1970), poet, historian and turkologist

== 20th century ==
- Ismail Gasprinsky, Crimean Tatar poet, publisher, intellectual (1851–1914)
- Mirjaqip Dulatuli (1885–1935) - poet, writer and a leader of Alash Orda government
- Akhmet Baytursinuli (1873–1937) - poet, writer, pedagogue and politician
- Neyzen Tevfik, poet (1879–1953)
- Magzhan Zhumabayev, poet (1893– 1938)
- Yahya Kemal Beyatlı, poet (1884–1958)
- Noman Çelebicihan, Crimean Tatar leader and poet (1885–1918)
- Bekir Choban-zade, Crimean Tatar poet and professor of Turkic languages (1893–1937)
- Faruk Nafiz Çamlıbel, poet (1898–1973)
- Nâzım Hikmet, poet (1901–1963)
- Ahmet Hamdi Tanpınar, poet, novelist, essayist (1901–1962)
- Ahmet Kutsi Tecer, poet, dramatist (1901–1967)
- Nihal Atsız, poet, writer and nationalist ideologue (1905–1975)
- Necip Fazıl Kısakürek, poet, essayist (1905–1983)
- Mohammad-Hossein Shahriar, poet (1906–1988)
- Ahmet Muhip Dıranas, poet (1909–1980)
- Cahit Sıtkı Tarancı, poet (1910–1956)
- Rıfat Ilgaz, poet, writer, journalist (1911–1993)
- Bedri Rahmi Eyüboğlu, painter and poet (1913–1975)
- Oktay Rıfat Horozcu, poet (1914–1988)
- Orhan Veli Kanık, poet (1914–1950)
- Melih Cevdet Anday, poet (1915–2002)
- Alykul Osmonov, poet (1915–1950)
- Âşık Veysel, ashik, poet (1894–1973)
- Behçet Necatigil, poet, dramatist (1916–1979)
- İlhan Berk, poet (1918–2008)
- Necati Cumalı, poet, dramatist (1921–2001)
- Abdurehim Ötkür, poet (1923–1995)
- Attilâ İlhan, writer, poet, captain (1925–2005)
- Bakhtiyar Vahabzadeh, poet (1925–2009)
- Can Yücel, poet (1926–1999)
- Ümit Yaşar Oğuzcan, poet, author (1926–1984)
- Edip Cansever, poet (1928–1986)
- Ece Ayhan Çağlar, poet (1931–2002)
- Talât Sait Halman, poet (1931–2014)
- Cemal Süreya, poet (1931–1990)
- Onat Kutlar, writer, poet (1936–1995)
- Aşık Mahzuni Şerif, ashik, poet (1939–2002)

== 21st century ==
- Sabit İnce, writer, poet (1954)
- İsmet Özel, poet (1944–)
- Haydar Ergülen, poet (1956–)
- Sunay Akın, poet, writer (1962–)
- Abdurehim Heyit, poet, singer (1962–)
- Süreyya Aylin Antmen (1981–)

== See also ==
- List of contemporary Turkish poets
- List of Ottoman poets
- Turkish literature
