= Ashik =

Folk singer in South Caucasus and Anatolia

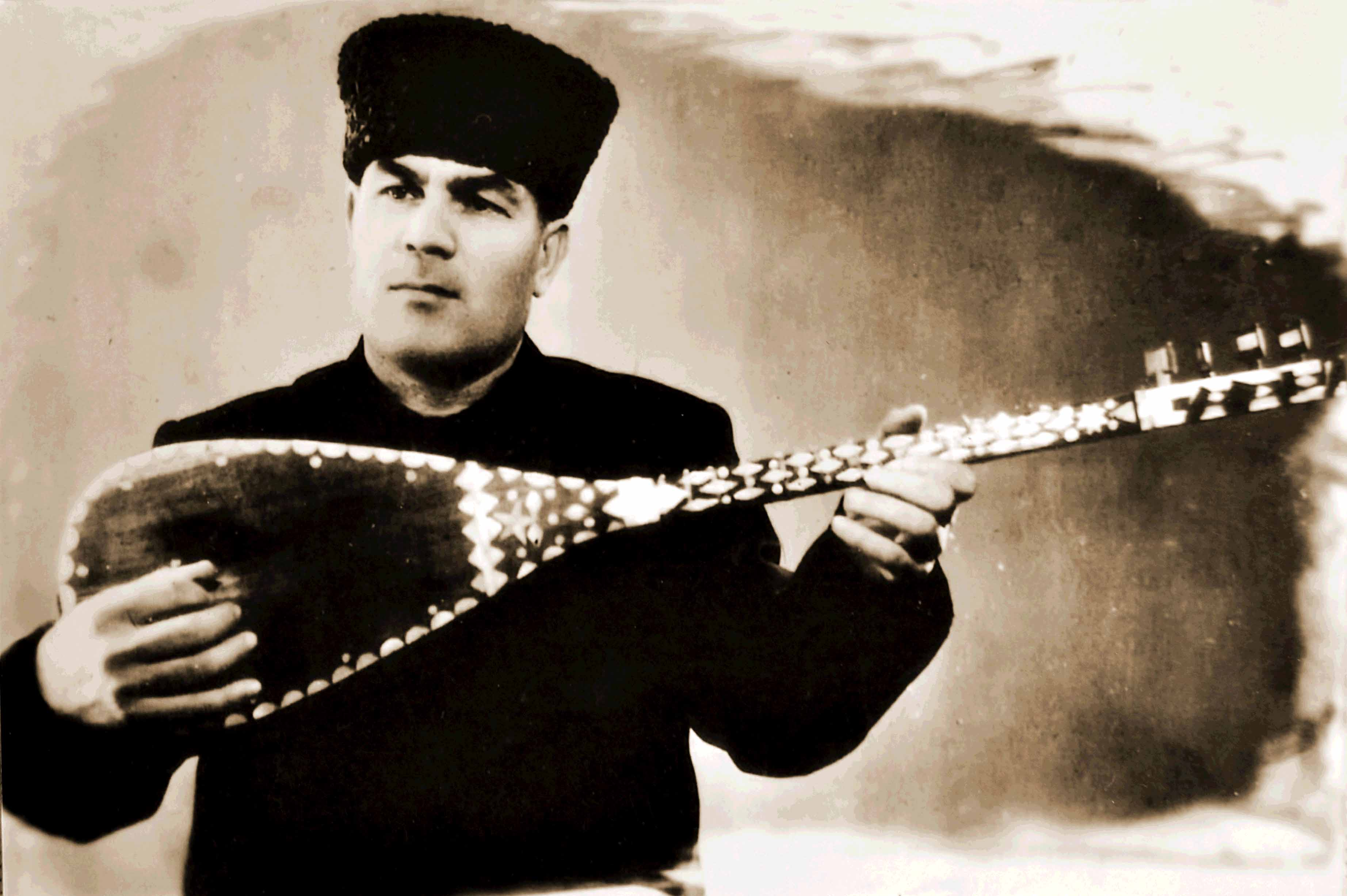
Ashik Ağalar Mikayılov playing the saz

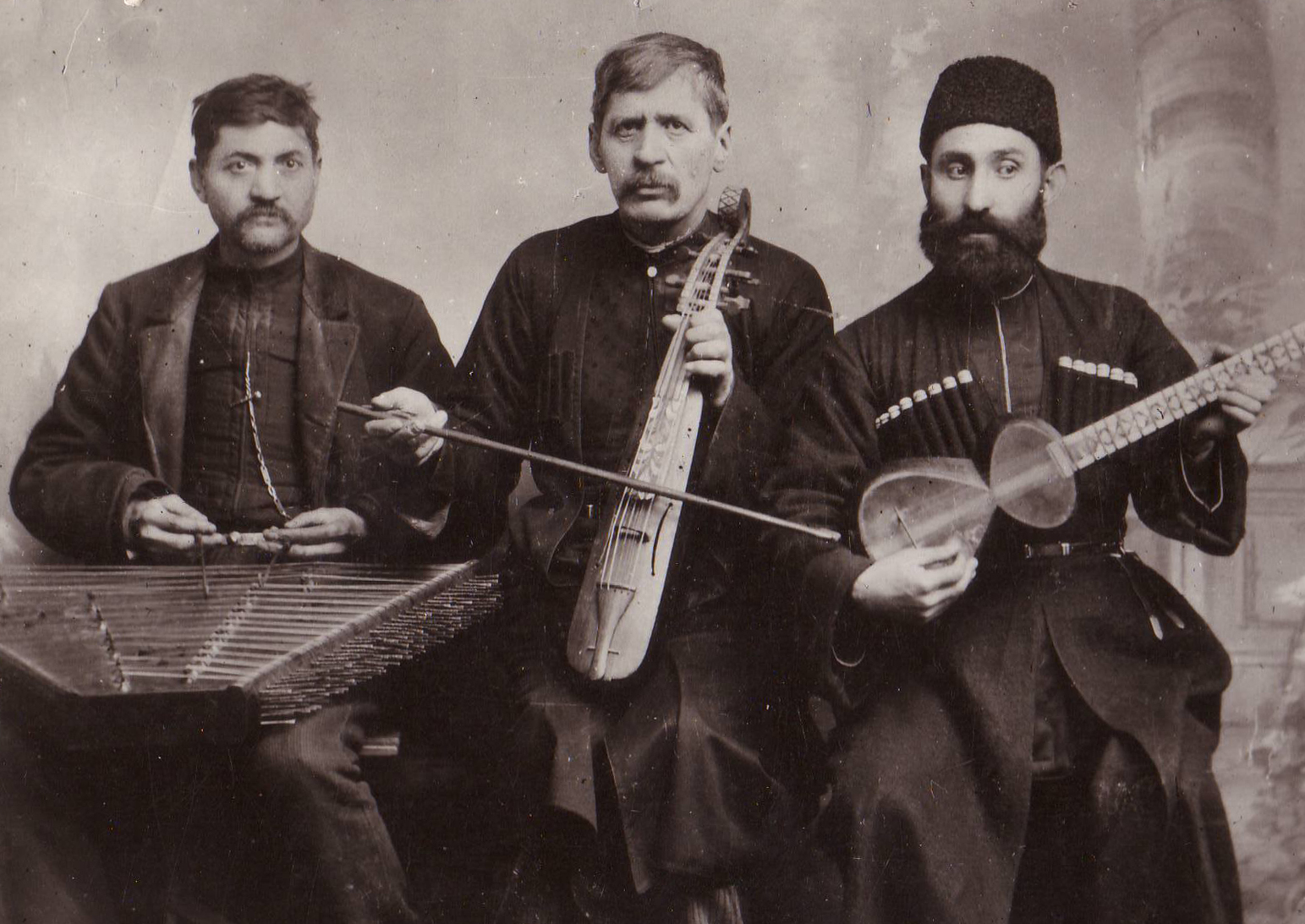
Ashugh Jivani (center, playing the kamani) with instrumentalists

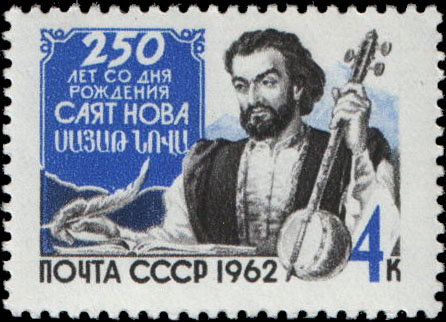
Soviet stamp from 1962 devoted to Sayat-Nova's 250 anniversary

An ashik (Azerbaijani: aşıq; Turkish: aşık) or ashugh (Armenian: աշուղ; Georgian: აშუღი) is traditionally a singer-poet and bard who accompanies his song—be it a dastan (traditional epic story, also known as hikaye) or a shorter original composition—with a long-necked lute (usually a bağlama or saz) in Azerbaijani culture, including Turkish and Iranian Azeri and non-Turkic cultures of South Caucasus (primarily Armenian and Georgian). In Azerbaijan, the modern ashik is a professional musician who usually serves an apprenticeship, masters playing the bağlama, and builds up a varied but individual repertoire of Turkic folk songs.

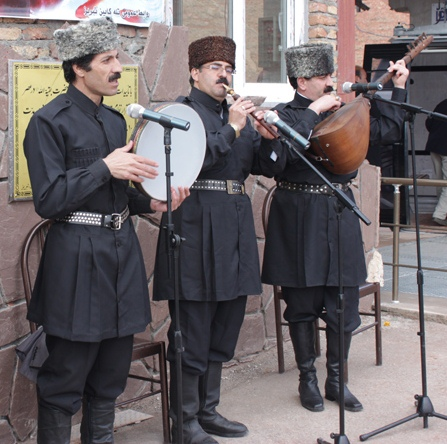
An ashik performance in Tabriz

== Etymology ==
The word ashiq (Arabic: عاشق, meaning "in love" or "lovelorn") is the nominative form of a noun derived from the word ishq (Arabic: عشق, "love"). The term is synonymous with ozan in Turkish and Azerbaijani, which it superseded during the fifteenth to sixteenth centuries. Other alternatives include saz şairi (meaning "saz poet") and halk şairi ("folk poet"). In Armenian, the term gusan, which referred to creative and performing artists in public theaters of Parthia and ancient as well as medieval Armenia, is often used as a synonym.

== History ==
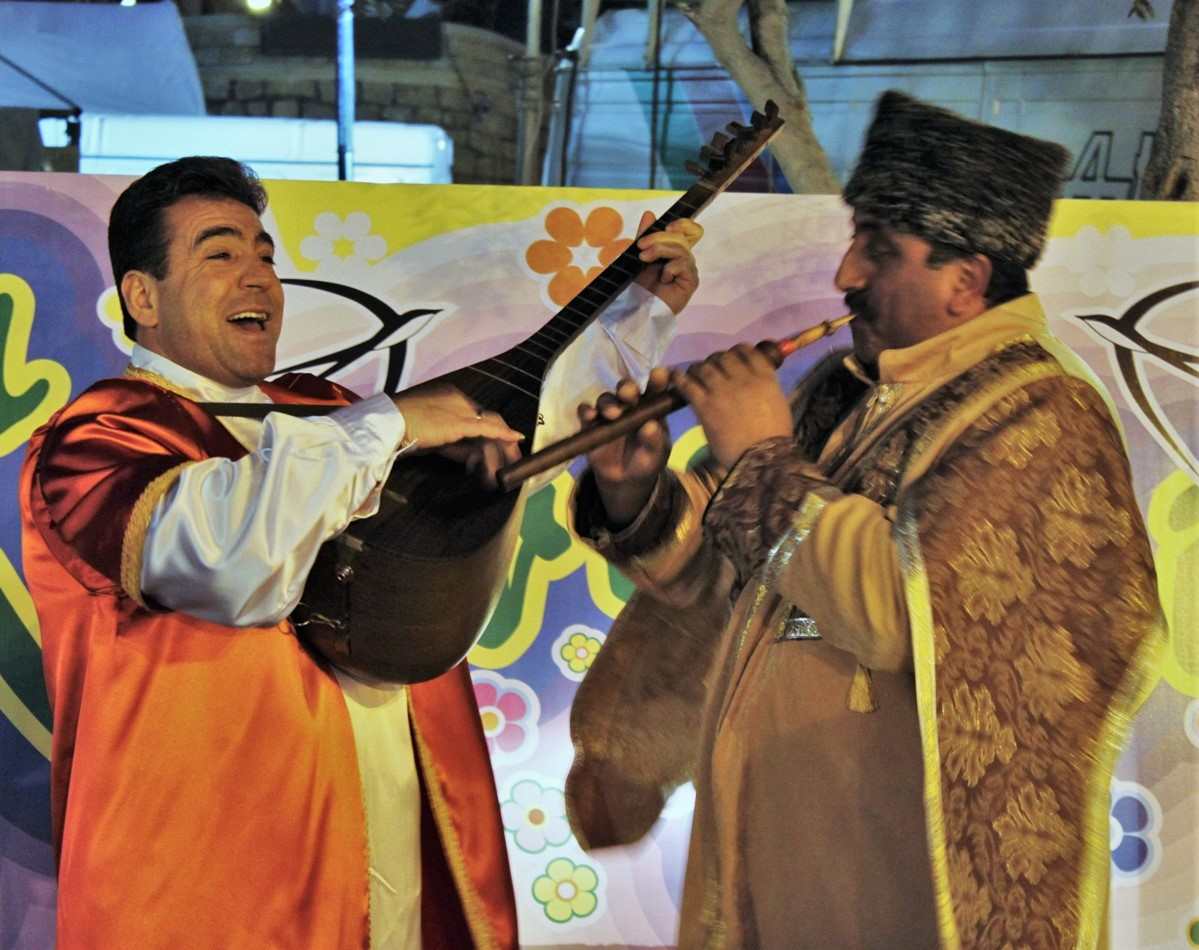
An ashik performance during Nowruz in Baku

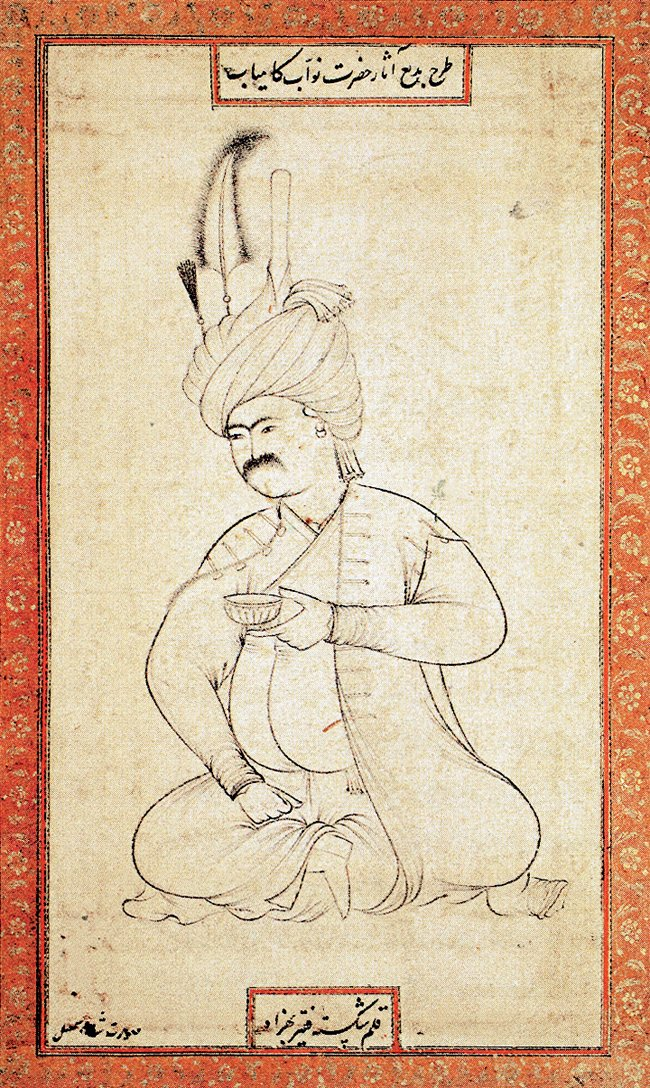
Ismail I (r. 1501–1524)

The ashik tradition among Turkic peoples of Anatolia, Azerbaijan, and Iran has its origin in pre-Islamic shamanism. The ancient ashiks were called by various names such as bakshy (bakhshi, baxşı), dede (dədə), and uzan or ozan. Among their various roles, they played a major part in the perpetuation of the oral tradition, promotion of the communal value system and traditional culture of their people. These wandering bards or troubadours are part of the current rural and folk culture of Azerbaijan, Iranian Azerbaijan, Turkey, the Turkmen Sahra (Iran) and Turkmenistan. Thus, traditionally, ashik may be defined as travelling bards who sang and played the saz, an eight- or ten-string plucked instrument in the form of a long-necked bağlama.

According to the Book of Dede Korkut, the roots of ashiks can be traced back to at least the 7th century, during the heroic age of the Oghuz Turks. This nomadic tribe journeyed westwards through Central Asia from the 9th century onward and settled in what is now Turkey, Azerbaijan, and the northwestern areas of Iran. Their music evolved during their migration and ensuing feuds with the original inhabitants of the acquired lands. An important component of this cultural evolution was when the Turks embraced Islam. Dervishes, desiring to spread the religion among their brothers who had not yet entered the Islamic fold, moved among the nomadic Turks. They chose the folk language and its associated musical form as an appropriate medium to transmit their messages. Ashik literature developed alongside Qalandar and Sufi culture and was refined since the time of Ahmad Yasawi in the early twelfth century.

The single most important event in the history of ashik music was the ascent to the throne of the Shi'i leader Ismail I (1487–1524), the founder of the Safavid Empire. He was a prominent poet and ruler whose followers, the Safavid order, believed him to be divine. In addition to his diwan, he compiled a mathnawi called the Deh-name, consisting of some eulogies of Ali. He used the pen-name Khata'i and is considered an amateur ashik . Isma'il's praised playing Saz as a virtue in one of his renowned quatrains;

Bu gün ələ almaz oldum mən sazım --- (Today, I embraced my Saz)
Ərşə dirək-dirək çıxar mənim avazım --- (My song is being echoed by heavens)
Dörd iş vardır hər qarındaşa lazım: --- (Four things are required for the life:)
Bir elm, bir kəlam, bir nəfəs, bir saz. --- (Conscience, speech, respiration, and Saz.)

According to Mehmet Fuat Köprülü's studies, the term ashik was used instead of ozan in Azerbaijan and parts of Anatolia after the 15th century. After the demise of the Safavid dynasty in Iran, Turkish culture could not sustain its early development among the elites. Instead, there was a surge in the development of verse-folk stories, mainly intended for performance by ashiks in weddings. Following the collapse of the Soviet Union the governments of new republics in Caucasus region and Central Asia sought their identity in traditional cultures of their societies. This elevated the status of ashugs as the guardians of national culture. The newfound unprecedented popularity and frequent concerts and performances in urban settings have resulted in rapid innovative developments aiming to enhance the urban-appealing aspects of ashik performances.

=== Ashugh music in Armenia ===
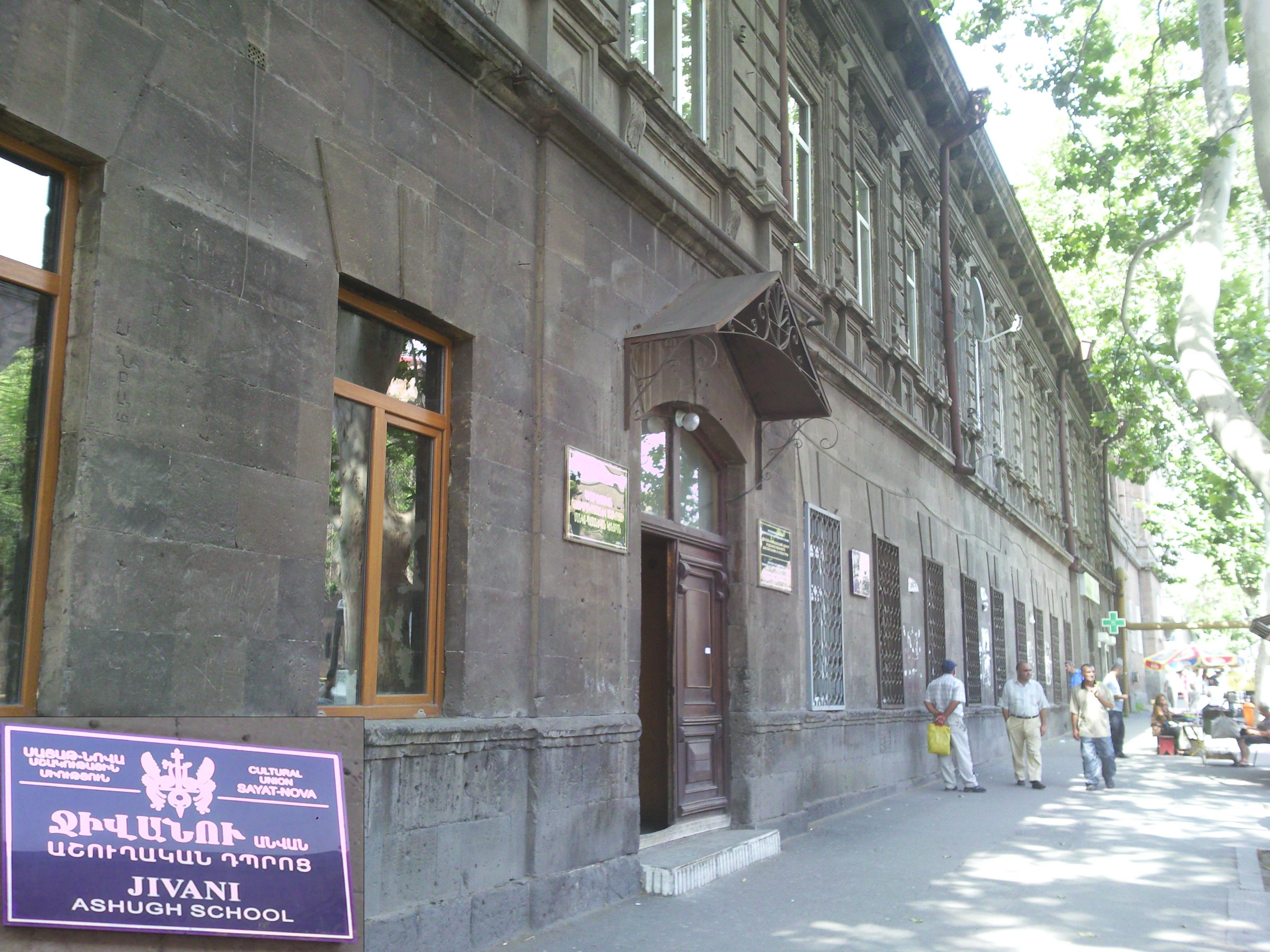
Armenian ashugh school in Yerevan

A concise account of the ashik (called ashugh in Armenian) music and its development in Armenia is given in Garland Encyclopedia of World Music. In Armenia, the ashugh are known since the 16th century onward, acting as the successors to the medieval gusan art. By far the most notable of the ashugh of all was Sayat Nova (1712–95), who honed the art of troubadour musicianship to crowning refinement.

=== Ashik music in Iranian Azerbaijan ===
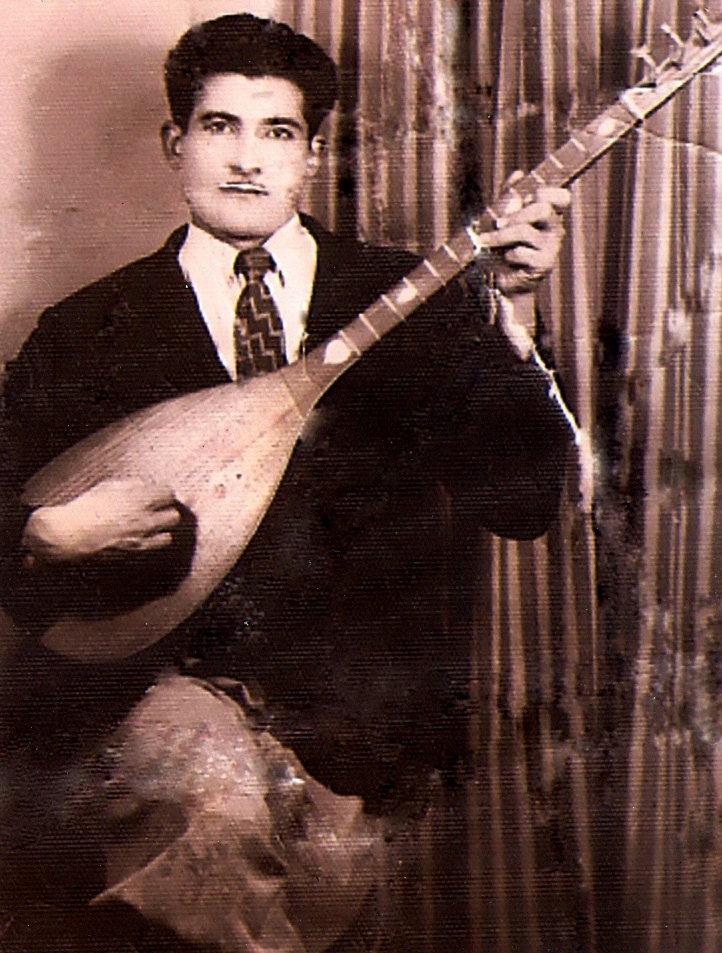
A portrait of Ashik Rasool Ghorbani taken in 1955

During the Pahlavi era Ashiks frequently performed in coffee houses in all the major cities of east and west Azerbaijan in Iran. Tabriz was the eastern center for the ashiks and Urmia the western center. In Tabriz ashiks most often performed with two other musicians, a balaban player and a qaval player; in Urmia the ashik was always a solo performer. After the Iranian revolution music was banned. Ten years later, the ashik Rasool Ghorbani, who had been forced to make a living as a travelling salesman, aspired to return to the glorious days of fame and leisure. He started composing songs with religious and revolutionary themes. The government, realizing the propaganda potential of these songs, allowed their broadcast in national radio and sent Rasool to perform in some European cities. This facilitated the emergence of the ashik music as the symbol of Azeri cultural identity.

In September 2009, Ashiqs of Azerbaijan was included into UNESCO list of Intangible Cultural Heritage.

== The foundations of ashik art ==
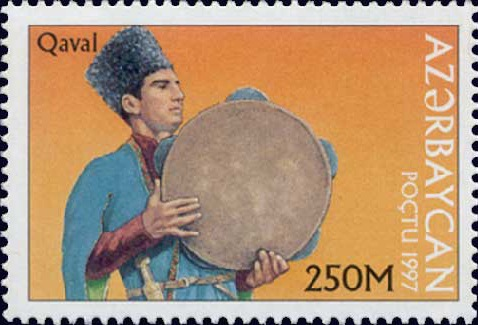
A stamp of qavals

Ashik art combines poetic, musical and performance ability. Ashiks themselves describe the art as the unified duo of saz and söz (word).This duo is conspicuously featured in a popular composition by Səməd Vurğun:

Binələri çadır çadır --- (The peaks rise up all around like tents)
Çox gəzmişəm özüm dağlar --- (I have wandered often in these mountains)
İlhamını səndən alıb --- (My saz and söz take inspiration)
Mənim sazım, sözüm dağlar. --- (From you, mountains.)

The following subsections provide more details about saz and söz.

=== Musical instruments ===
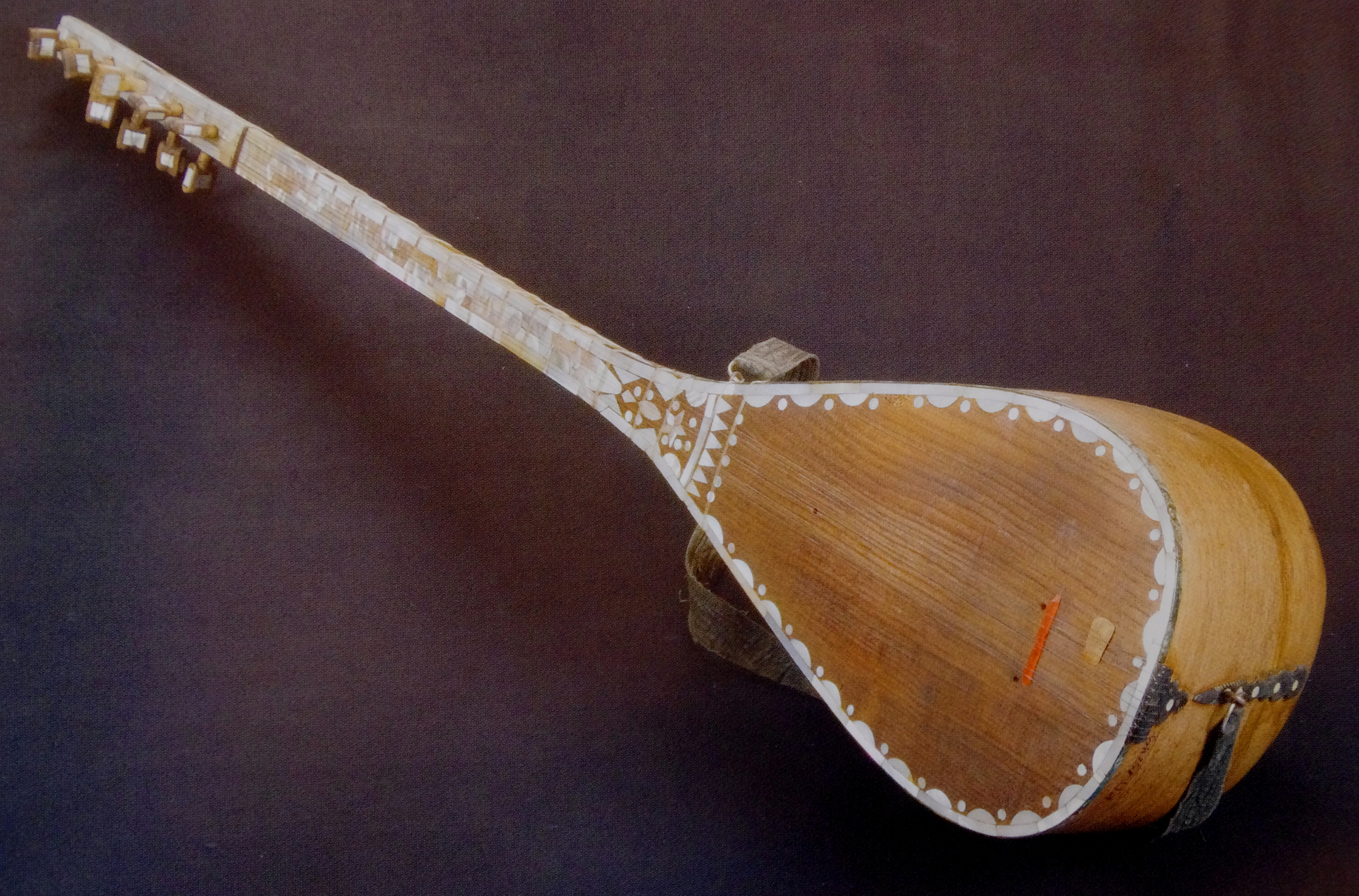
Bağlama (saz)

Mastering in playing saz is the essential requirement for an ashik. This instrument, a variant of which is known as Bağlama, is a stringed musical instrument and belongs to the family of long-necked lutes. Often performances of ashiks are accompanied by an ensemble of balaban and qaval performers. During Eurovision Song Contest 2012 all three instruments were symbolically played as a cultural symbol of the host country, Azerbaijan.

=== Poetry genres ===
The most spread poetry genres are gerayly, qoshma and tajnis.

=== Ethical code of behaviour and attitude for ashiks ===
The defining characteristic of ashik profession is the ethical code of behaviour and attitude, which has been summarized by Aşiq Ələsgər in the following verses;

Aşıq olub diyar-diyar gəzənin ----(To be a bard and wander far from home)
Əzəl başdan pürkəmalı gərəkdi --- (You knowledge and thinking head must have.)
Oturub durmaqda ədəbin bilə --- (How you are to behave, you too must know,)
Mə'rifət elmində dolu gərəkti --- (Politeness, erudition you must have.)
Xalqa həqiqətdən mətləb qandıra --- (He should be able to teach people the truth,)
Şeytanı öldürə, nəfsin yandıra --- (To kill evil within himself, refrain from ill emotions,)
El içinde pak otura pak dura --- (He should socialize virtuously)
Dalısınca xoş sedalı gərəkdi --- (Then people will think highly of him)
Danışdığı sözün qiymətin bilə --- (He should know the weight of his words,)
Kəlməsindən ləl'i-gövhər tokülə --- (He should be brilliant in speech,)
Məcazi danışa, məcazi gülə --- (He should speak figuratively,)
Tamam sözü müəmmalı gərəkdi --- (And be a politician in discourse.)
Arif ola, eyham ilə söz qana --- (Be quick to understand a hint, howe'er,)
Naməhrəmdən şərm eyleyə, utana --- (Of strangers you should, as a rule, beware,)
Saat kimi meyli Haqq'a dolana --- (And like a clock advance to what is fair.)
Doğru qəlbi, doğru yolu gərəkdi --- (True heart and word of honour you must have.)
Ələsgər haqq sözün isbatın verə --- (Ələsgər will prove his assertions,)
Əməlin mələklər yaza dəftərə --- (Angels will record his deeds,)
Her yanı istese baxanda göre --- (Your glance should be both resolute and pure,)
Teriqetde bu sevdalı gerekdi --- (You must devote himself to righteous path.)

== Ashik stories (dastan) ==
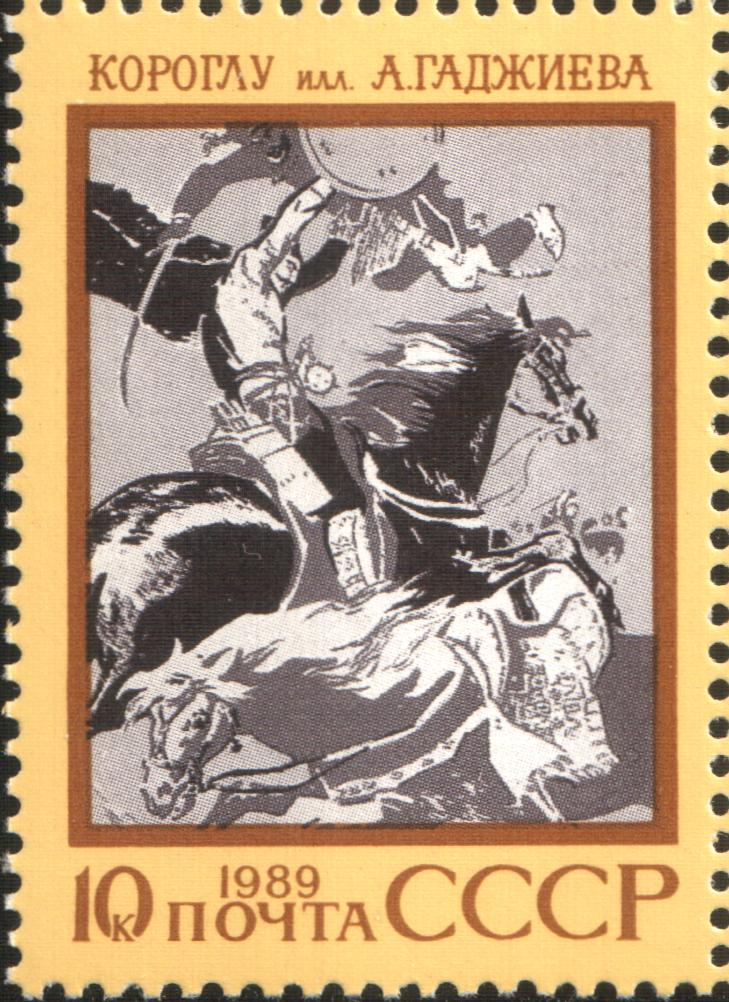
Stamp featuring epic poem "Koroglu", from the series Epic poems of USSR nations, 1989

İlhan Başgöz was the first to introduce the word hikaye into the academic literature to describe ashik stories. According to Başgöz, hikaye cannot properly be included in any of the folk narrative classification systems presently used by Western scholars. Though prose narrative is dominant in a hikaye, it also includes several folk songs. These songs, which represent the major part of Turkish folk music repertory, may number more than one hundred in a single hikaye, each having three, five or more stanzas.

As the art of ashik is based on oral tradition, the number of ashik stories can be as many as the ashiks themselves. Throughout the centuries of this tradition, many stories and epics have thrived, and some have survived to our times. The main themes of most ashik stories are worldly love or epics of wars and battles.

The most famous hikayes include:

- Shah Ismail, the founder of the Safavid empire, is the protagonist of a major hikaye. Despite the apparent basis in history, Shah Ismail's hikaye demonstrates a remarkable transformative ability. Feared as a ruthless despot during his lifetime, Shah Ismail becomes a poetic maestro in the hikaye, with his sword replaced by his saz, which is the weapon of choice for Shah Ismail's new persona of folk hero.
- The Warrior of The North. A romantic action epic about a bard named Ashik in Constantinople in the 16th century who faces political and military problems and saves many people. In the end, he marries his soul mate, Nuur, but dies the same day in an attempt to save her from the evil Hardun.
- The Epic of Köroğlu is one of the most widespread of the Turkic hikayes. It is shared not only by nearly all Turkic peoples, but also by some non-Turkic neighboring communities, such as the Armenians, Georgians, Kurds, Tajiks, and Afghans. Although the hikaye's path of transmission is not yet fully understood, most researchers agree that it originated in the south Caucasus region, most likely Azerbaijan. In the Azeri version, the epic combines the occasional romance with Robin Hood-like chivalry. Köroğlu, is himself an ashik, who punctuates the third-person narratives of his adventures by breaking into verse: this is Köroğlu. This popular story has spread from Anatolia to the countries of Central Asia somehow changing its character and content. Azerbaijani composer Uzeyir Hajibeyov has created an opera by this name, using the ashik stories and masterfully combined some ashik music with this major classical work.
- Ashiq Qərib, Azeri epic, made famous by Mikhail Lermontov, is another major story of a wandering ashik who began his journeys with worldly love and attains wisdom by traveling and learning then achieving sainthood. The story of Ashiq Qərib has been the main feature of a movie with the same name by director and producer Sergei Parajanov. In early 1980s Aşıq Kamandar narrated and sang the story in a one-hour-long TV program, the cosset record of which was widely distributed in Iranian Azerbaijan and had a key impact on the revival of ashug music.
- Aşıq Valeh is the story of a debate between Aşıq Valeh (1729–1822) and Aşıq Zərniyar. Forty ashiks have already lost the debate to Aşıq Zərniyar and have been imprisoned. Valeh, however, wins the debate, frees the jailed ashiks and marries Zərniyar.

== Verbal dueling (deyişmə) ==
In order to stay in the profession and defend their reputation ashiks used to challenge each other by indulging in verbal duelings, which were held in public places. In its simplest form one ashik would recite a riddle by singing and the other had to respond by means of improvisation to the verses resembling riddles in form. Here is an example:

The first ashik	The second ashik
Tell me what falls to the ground from the sky?	Rain falls down to the ground from the sky
Who calms down sooner of all?	A child calms down sooner of all.
What is passed from hand to hand?	Money is passed from hand to hand

The second ashik	Shik
What remains dry in water?	Light does not become wet in water
Guess what does not become dirty in the ground?	Only stones at the pier remain clean.
Tell me the name of the bird living alone in the nest	The name of the bird living in its nest in loneliness is heart.

== Famous ashiks ==
=== 21st century ===
- Changiz Mehdipour, born in Sheykh Hoseynlu, has significantly contributed to the revival and development of ashik music. His book on the subject attempts to adapt the ashik music to the artistic taste of the contemporary audience.
- Samira Aliyeva, born in Baku (1981), is a popular professional ashik who teaches at the Azerbaijan State University of Culture and Art. She is committed to the survival of the ashik tradition.
- Zulfiyya Ibadova, born in 1976, is a passionate and vibrant performer with a strong individual style. She has written a great deal of original music and lyrics, and likes combining the Saz with other instruments.
- Fazail Miskinli, born in 1972, is a master Saz player. He teaches at the Azerbaijan State University of Culture and Art.

=== 20th century ===
- Ali Ekber Çiçek, Ashik Ibreti, Ashik Khanlar, Ashik Mubarak Yaafar, Muhlis Akarsu, Ashig Adalet, Ashik Daimi, Davut Sulari, Ashig Hossein Bozalganly, Ashig Hossein Sarajly, Ashig Mikayil Azafly, Ashig Emrah, Ashik Seyit Meftuni, Âşık Veysel
- Neşet Ertaş, was born in 1938 in Kırşehir, and started playing bağlama since he was 5. He died on 25 September 2012 in İzmir. The opening quatrain of his composition, Yalan Dünya, is as the following:

Hep sen mi ağladın hep sen mi yandın, --- (Did you cry all the time, did you burn all the time?)
Ben de gülemedim yalan dünyada --- (I couldn't smile either in this lying world)
Sen beni gönlümce mutlu mu sandın --- (Did you think I was at peace with my heart)
Ömrümü boş yere çalan dünyada. --- (In this world that wasted my life in vain)

- Ashig Hossein Javan, born in Oti Kandi in Qareh Dagh, is the legendary ashik who was exiled to Soviet Union due to his revolutionary songs during the brief reign of Azerbaijan People's Government following the World War II. Hoseyn Javan's music, in contrast to the contemporary poetry in Iran, emphasizes on realism and highlights the beauties of real life. One of Hoseyn's songs, with the title "Kimin olacaqsan yari, bəxtəvər?", is among the most famous ashugh songs.
- Kamandar Afandov was born in 1932 in Georgia. In early eighties Kamndar performed shortened version of famous hikayes intended for contemporary audience. These performances were effective in the revival of ashik music.
- Rasool Ghorbani, recognized as the godfather among the masters of ashugh music, was born in 1933 in AbbasAbad. Rasool started his music career in 1952 and by 1965 was an accomplished ashik. Rasool had performed in international music festivals held in France, Germany, the Netherlands, England, Japan, China, Czech Republic, Slovakia, Austria, Australia, Azerbaijan, Serbia, Turkey and Hungary. Rasool has been awarded highest art awards of Iran, and will be honored by government during the celebration for his 80th birthday.
- Ashik Mahzuni Sherif,(17 November 1940 – 17 May 2002), was a folk musician, ashik, composer, poet, and author from Turkey. His had an undeniable contribution in popularizing ashik music in intellectual circles. The opening quatrain of his composition, İşte gidiyorum çeşm-i siyahım, is as the following:

İşte gidiyorum çeşm-i siyahım --- (That's it, I go my black eyed)
Önümüze dağlar sıralansa da --- (Despite mountains ranked before us)
Sermayem derdimdir servetim ahım --- (My capital is my sorrow, my wealth is my trouble)
Karardıkça bahtım karalansa da --- (Withal my blacken fortune darkened")

- Ashik Veysel (25 October 1894 – 21 March 1973). The opening quatrain of his composition, Kara Toprak ("Black earth"), is as the following:

Dost dost diye nicesine sarıldım --- (I expected for many people to be real friends)
Benim sâdık yârim kara topraktır --- (My faithful beloved is black earth)
Beyhude dolandım boşa yoruldum --- (I wandered around with no end, I got tired for nothing)
Benim sâdık yârim kara topraktır --- (My faithful beloved is black earth)

=== 19th century ===
- Ashik Summani, Ashig Aly, Molla Juma, Ashig Musa,
- Ashiq Basti (1836–1936), is one of the most outstanding female representatives of the art of Ashig in nineteenth century Azerbaijan. She was born in the Loh village of the Kalbajar region. She had a deep knowledge of Azerbaijani folk literature and was able to recite poems of her own at these folk ceremonies. She also learned to play the saz. Basti was known to be an active member of 'Gurban Bulaghi', a famous literary gathering of her era. She fell deeply in love with a shepherd sometime between the age of seventeen and eighteen. Her first love, however, was killed by a nobleman in her presence. Having helplessly witnessed this scene, Basti was thrown into a state of mental turmoil by this tragic incident. In her poems, Basti refers to her sweetheart as Khanchoban. In her lifetime, an epic story called 'Basti and Khanchoban' was created to deal with her ill-fated love. She avenges the nobleman who had killed her beloved by cursing him in her poems. Basti lost her eyesight from her endless weeping and she grew old well before her time. She was called 'Blind Basti' and a saying was created about her: 'Even the stone was crying when Basti cried'. However, she lived a long life and died in 1936, at the age of one hundred.

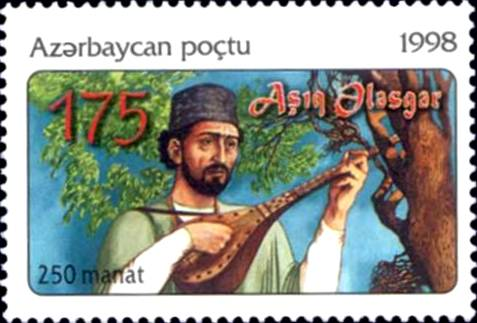
An Azerbaijani postal stamp featuring Ashig Alasgar

- Ashig Alasgar, perhaps the most renowned Azerbaijani ashik of all ages, was born in 1821 in Gegharkunik Province (Գեղարքունիքի մարզ) of the present day Armenia to an impoverished family. At the age of 14 he was employed as a servant boy and worked for five years, during which fell in love with his employer's daughter, Səhnəbanı. The girl was married off to her cousin and Alasgar was sent home. This failed love urged young Alasgar to buy a saz and seek apprenticeship with Ashik Ali for five years. He emerged as an accomplished ashik and poet and in 1850, unwillingly, defeated his master in a verbal dueling. The rest of Alasgar's productive life was spent training ashiks and composing songs until his death in 1926. Here, we present the opening verses of one of Alasgar's finest compositions, titled Deer (Jeyran). The song has been recently performed by Azerbaijan's beloved traditional singer Fargana Qasimova. Alim Qasimov offers the following commentary on this popular song: "In Azerbaijan, jeyran refers to a kind of deer that lives in the mountains and the plains. They’re lovely animals, and because their eyes are so beautiful, poets often use this word. There are many girls named Jeyran in Azerbaijan. We hope that when listeners hear this song, they’ll get in touch with their own inner purity and sincerity."

Durum dolanım başına, --- (Let me encircle you with love,)
Qaşı, gözü qara, Ceyran! --- (Your black eyes and eyebrows, Jeyran.)
Həsrətindən xəstə düşdüm, --- (I have fallen into the flames of longing,)
Eylə dərdə çara, Ceyran! --- (Help me to recover from this pain, Jeyran".)
.......

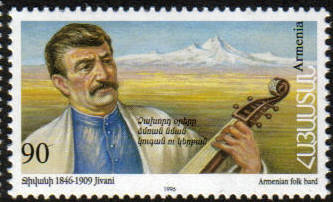
An Armenian postal stamp featuring ashugh Jivani

- Jivani (Armenian: Ջիվանի, 1846–1909), born Serob Stepani Levonian (Սերոբ Ստեփանի Լևոնյան), was an Armenian ashugh (or gusan) and poet. Jivani's compositions mostly deal with social issues. An example:

THE mournful and unhappy days, like winter, come and go.
We should not be discouraged, they will end, they come and go.
Our bitter griefs and sorrows do not tarry with us long;
Like customers arrayed in line, they come, and then they go. ...

=== 18th century ===
- Sayat-Nova
- Khasta Qasim, (1684–1760) was one of the most popular folk poets in Azerbaijan. Khasta, which he chose for a pen-name, means "one in pain".
- Dadaloğlu
- Zarnigar Derbentli

=== 17th century ===
- Naghash Hovnatan was an Armenian poet, ashugh, painter, and founder of the Hovnatanian artistic family. He was born in 1661 in the town of Shorot, Nakhijevan. He is considered the founder of the new Armenian minstrel school, following medieval Armenian lyric poetry.
- Kul Nesîmî, Aşıq Abdulla, Sarı Aşıq
- Karacaoğlan is a 17th-century Ottoman folk poet and ashik, who was born around 1606 and died around 1680. The opening quatrain of his composition, Elif, is as the following:

incecikten bir kar yağar, --- (With its tender flakes, snow flutters about,)
Tozar Elif, Elif deyi... --- (Keeps falling, calling out "Elif… Elif…”)
Deli gönül abdal olmuş, --- (This frenzied heart of mine wanders about)
Gezer Elif, Elif deyi... --- (Like minstrels, calling out "Elif… Elif…”)

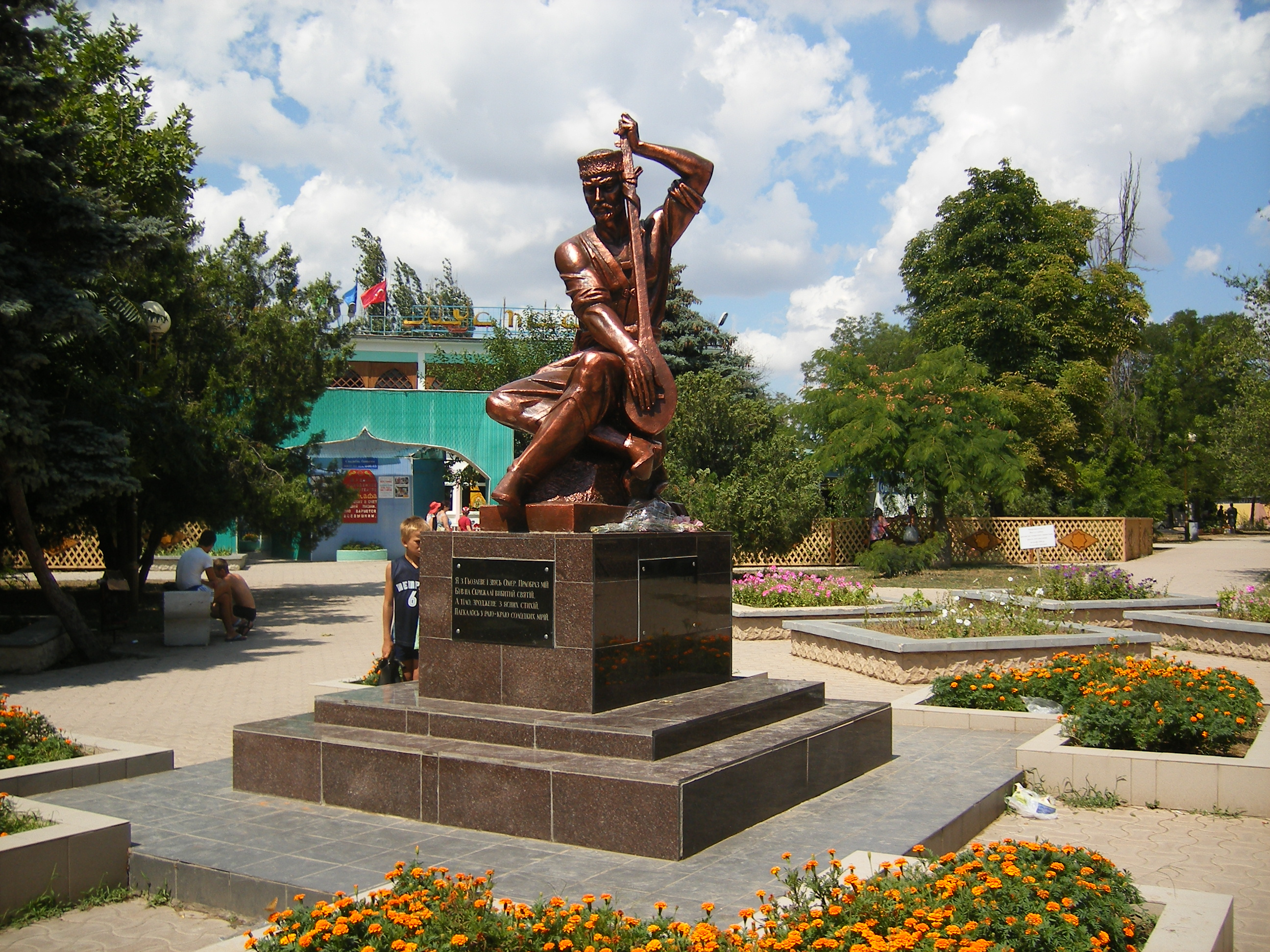
Statue of Aşıq Ümer in Yevpatoria

- Aşıq Ümer (1621—1707) medieval Crimean Tatar poet from Kezlev. He wrote mainly lyric poems and greatly influenced the later ashiks.
- Ashik Abbas Tufarganly was born in the late 16th century in Azarshahr. According to a popular ashik hikaye, known as Abbas və Gülgəz, he was a love rival of King Abbas. The facts about Ashik Abbas's life are mixed with the myths of the said hikaye. Ashik Abbas's compositions have survived and are still song by contemporary ashiks. A famous song starts as the following:

Ay həzarət, bir zamana gəlibdir, --- (Oh brothers and sisters, what have we come to:)
Ala qarğa şux tərlanı bəyənməz --- (The jay hates the eagle as never before.)

- Gevherî, Turkish Ozan from Afshar tribe.

Başına bir hal gelirse canım, --- If something happens to you,
Dağlara gel dağlara, --- Come to the mountains,
Seni saklar vermez ele canım, --- She will embrace you as her own,
Seni saklar vermez ele. --- Never hands you in to the strangers.
........

=== 16th century ===
- Shah Ismail Khatai, (1485–1524) was the founder of the Safavid dynasty (1502–1736). Writing under the pen name of

Khatai, he produced a large volume of lyric poetry in Azerbaijani language. Khatai's poetry is graceful and polished and his language closely approaches to folk idiom:

Winter's shaken off, and spring arrives! --- Rosebuds waken, garden plot revives,
Birds all trill in aching harmony,--- Love's a thrilling flame, disturbing me.
Earth is dressed in furry, downy green, --- Whispers press the silence once serene, .......

- Aşıq Qərib
- Nahapet Kuchak (Armenian: Նահապետ Քուչակ) (died 1592) was an Armenian medieval poet, considered one of the first ashughs. He is best known for his hairens (հայրեն), "couplets with a single coherent theme." Kuchak was probably born in the village of Kharakonis, near the city of Van. Later, he married a woman named Tangiatun. The poet lived his entire life near the Lake Van area until his death in 1592. Kuchak was buried in the cemetery of Kharakonis St. Theodoros Church and his grave became a pilgrimage site.
- Pir Sultan Abdal (ca. 1480–1550) was a Turkish Alevi poet and ashik. During the time, Pir Sultan Abdal with the villagers, went against injustice, and was hanged by the Sivas governor Hızır pasha, who was once his comrade. The opening quatrain of his composition, THE ROUGH MAN, is as the following:

Dostun en güzeli bahçesine bir hoyrat girmiş, --- (The rough man entered the lover's garden)
Korudur hey benli dilber korudur --- (It is woods now, my beautiful one, it is woods,)
Gülünü dererken dalını kırmış --- (Gathering roses, he has broken their stems)
Kurudur hey benli dilber kurudur --- (They are dry now, my beautiful one, they are dry)

- Ashiq Qurbani was born in 1477 in Dirili. He was a contemporary of Shah Ismail and may have served as the court musician. His compositions were handed down as gems of oral art from generation to generation and constitute a necessary repertoire of every ashik. A famous qushma, titled Violet, starts as the following:

Başina mən dönüm ala göz Pəri, --- (O my dearest, my love, my beautiful green-eyed Pari)
Adətdir dərələr yaz bənəvşəni. --- (Custom bids us pluck violets when spring days begin)
Ağ nazik əlinən dər dəstə bağla, --- (With your tender white hand gather a nosegay,)
Tər buxaq altinə düz bənəvşəni... --- (Pin it under your dainty chin.....)

=== 15th century ===
- Kaygusuz Abdal, was born in the late 14th century into a noble and aristocratic family of the Anatolian province of Teke and died in 1445. He traveled throughout the Middle East and eventually came to Cairo where he founded a Bektashi convent. Kaygusuz's poetry is among the strangest expressions of Sufism. He does not hesitate to describe in great detail his dreams of good food, nor does he shrink from singing about his love adventures with a charming young man. A tekerleme by Kaygusuz sounds like a perfect translation of a nursery rhyme:

kaplu kaplu bağalar kanatlanmiş uçmağa.. ---- The turturturtles have taken wings to fly ...

- Imadaddin Nasimi, born 1369 and skinned alive in Aleppo in 1417, was an Azerbaijani or Iraqi Turkmen Ḥurūfī poet. His quatrains are very close to ashik bayati.

=== 13th century ===
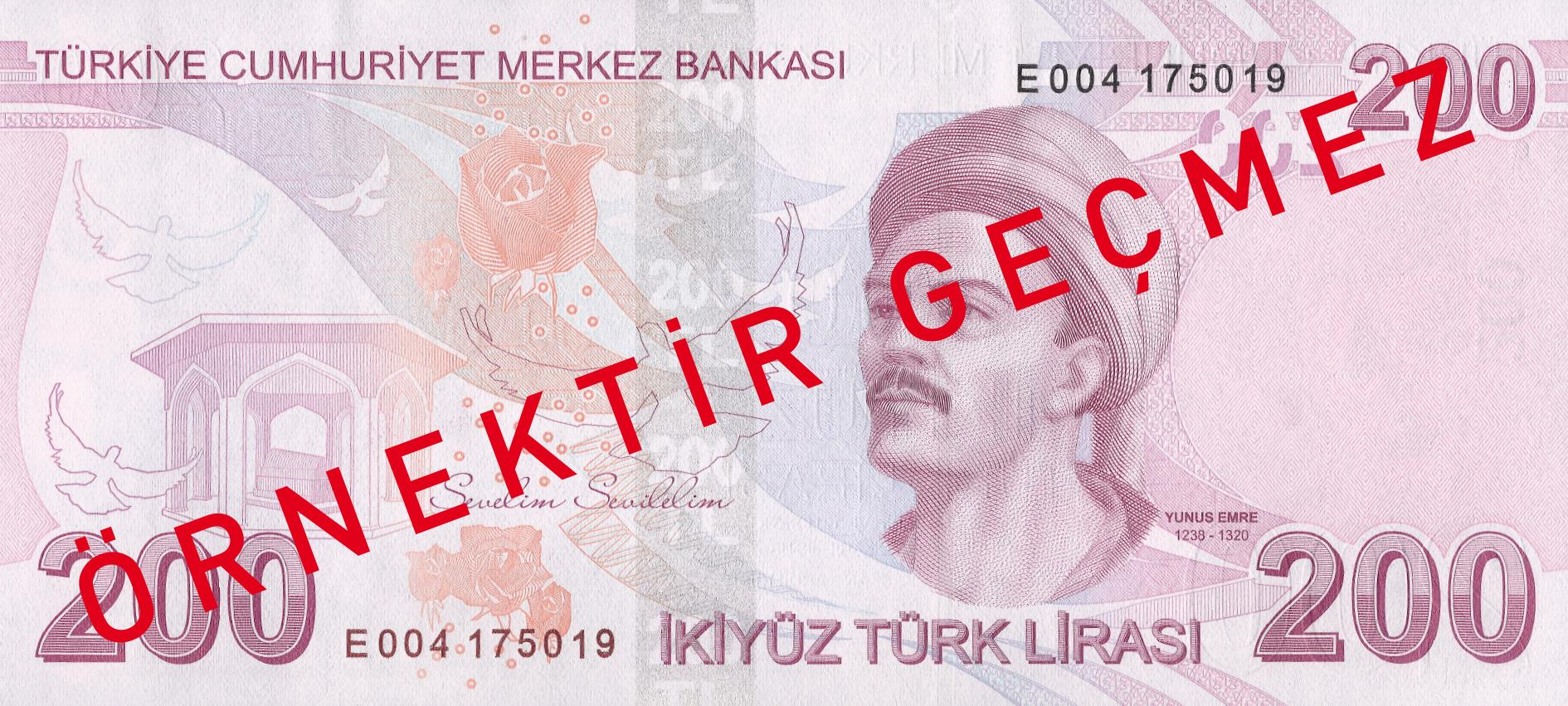
A Turkish banknote (2009) with Yunus Emre's image

- Yunus Emre (1240–1321) was one of the first Turkish poets who wrote poems in his mother tongue rather than Persian or Arabic, which were the writing medium of the era. Emre was not literally an ashik, but his undeniable influence on the evolution of ashik literature is being felt to the present times. The opening quatrain of his composition, Bülbül Kasidesi Sözleri, is as the following:

İsmi sübhan virdin mi var? --- (is The Father's name your mantra?)
Bahçelerde yurdun mu var? --- (are those gardens your home?)
Bencileyin derdin mi var? --- (is your plight just as mine?)
Garip garip ötme bülbül --- (don't sing in sorrow nightingale)

== See also ==
- Ashiqs of Azerbaijan
- Aqyn
- Bakshy
- Dengbêj
- Gusans
- Khananda
- Ishq
- Ashik Kerib and Ashiq Qarib
- Epic of Koroghlu
- Epic of Manas
- The Color of Pomegranates
- List of Turkic-languages poets
