= Ballad of Osman the Young =

Turkish folk song

"Genç Osman Türküsü"
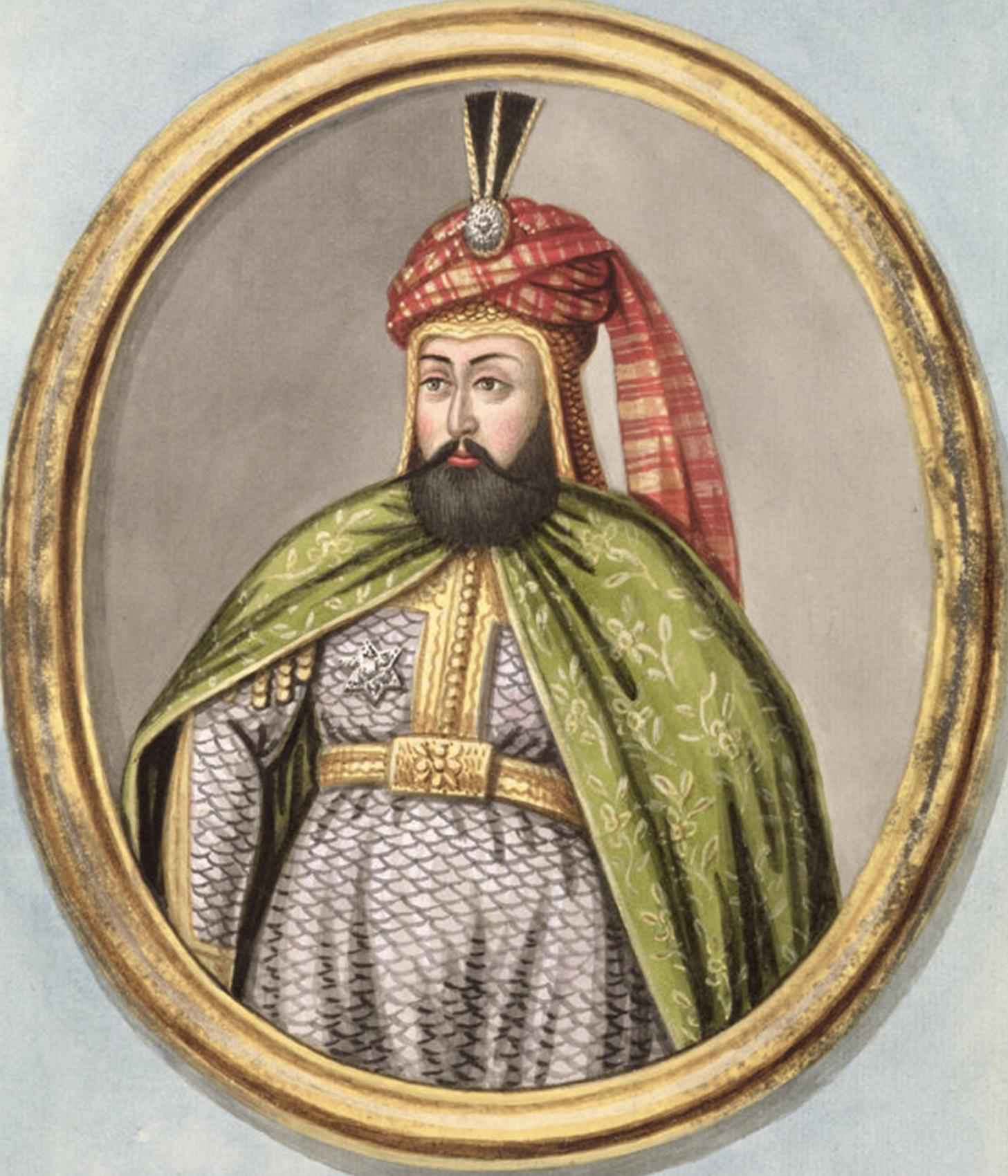
- There is a folk tale that Murat IV, the sultan of the period, was very upset when Osman the Young fell into the Tigris and died.

Song
- Genre: Turkish folk music
- Songwriters: Unknown (speculated to be Murad IV, Kayıkçı Kul Mustafa or Karacaoğlan)

Basic melody of the song
- file; help

Ballad of Osman the Young (Turkish: Genç Osman Türküsü), is a Turkish ballad (türkü) that is rumored to be originally written by Murad IV for a janissary soldier named Osman who died in Siege of Baghdad (1638). The consensus however is that it was written by a Bektashi poet named Kayıkçı Kul Mustafa in a form of emotional poetic exchange in epic form, and that it was arranged by Osman Şevki Uludağ and composed and made into a song by Muzaffer Sarısözen.

== Story ==
There are several stories associated with janissary soldier named Osman, not to be confused with Sultan Osman the Young, the shared feature is that Osman was a young Turkish man who lived in Aksaray or Tokat and despite his young age enlisted in the janissary corps and joined the Siege of Baghdad (1638) and died at the gates, one of two recorded instances goes like this:

Murat IV convenes the War Council: He orders volunteer soldiers to join the Baghdad expedition and says: 'Also, send messengers everywhere, those who volunteer should twist their moustache so that a comb should stand on it.' When the messengers who came to Başçiftlik to collect volunteer soldiers for the army saw the young men wrestling, they read the Sultan's edict. Young Osman, a chivalrous 18-year-old boy who had not even grown a moustache yet, said that he wanted to enlist in the army. When he was told 'You are just a child, you haven't even grown a moustache yet!', he stabbed the bone comb in his pocket into his lips. Blood gushed out from his lips. Thereupon, the Sultan's men enlist Young Osman in the army; Young Osman shows great heroism in the conquest of Baghdad. Although he was hit by tens of arrows, he did not drop the banner in his hand, and erected the banner in Baghdad Castle. When the mockers from Başçiftlik told Young Osman's mother about Osman's martyrdom and the heroism he showed, his mother said, 'I never breastfed him without ablution.'

Another instance is that the news of his death reached the court of sultan after his death and sultan was very upset of the news, before that no one aware that he joined the siege:

He was born in 1621 in Dorikini (Genç Osman) village of Aksaray. He was skilful in wrestling, archery and swordplay. He wanted to join the army when Sultan Murad IV visited Aksaray during the Baghdad Expedition, but he was not taken into the army because of his young age. Young Osman, the fat young man of Aksaray, who secretly joined the Ottoman army, erected the banner on the bastions during the conquest of Baghdad and was martyred there at the age of 17. Murad IV is rumoured to have said; 'I wish I had not conquered Baghdad and my Young Osman had not died.'

There is also another folk tale that implies that there were witnesses of Osman's bravery and one of them was Kayıkçı Kul Mustafa, in this record Osman the Young who was from Aksaray fought bravely "his head on his arm" and "opened the gates of Baghdad", he is referred to have the rank of Sardar. In this tale he has a quarrel with recruiters and tries to convince them to be recruited into the Ottoman army. A less popular rendition of this folktale is associated with Karacaoğlan gives away the information that a thousand Ottoman soldiers were massacred on the "mountains" by the enemy forces and first one of them was the Osman the Young, Osman the Young was a Shahbaz and after Osman's death the sultan mourned leaning on his sword.

== Lyrics ==
Turkish

Of, of Genç Osman dediğin bir küçük uşak
Beline bağlamış ibrişim kuşak oy oy!...
Aman, askerin içinde birinci uşak
Allah, Allah deyip geçer Genç Osman oy, oy!

Of, of Genç Osman dediğin bir küçük aslan
Bağdat'ın içine girilmez yastan oy, oy!...
Aman her ana doğurmaz böyle bir aslan,
Allah, Allah deyip geçer Genç Osman oy, oy!

Of, of Bağdat'ın kapısını Genç Osman açtı,
Düşmanın cümlesi önünden kaçtı oy oy!..
Aman kelle koltuğunda üç gün savaştı
Allah, Allah deyip geçer Genç Osman oy, oy!

Translation:
English

Oh! Osman the Young is a little servant.
He tied a sash of twine around his waist, oh, oh!...
Oh my, the first boy in the army
Allah, Allah, says Osman the Young oh, oh!

Young Osman is a little lion.
Baghdad could be sieged because of mourning, oh, oh!...
Not every mother gives birth to such a lion,
Allah, Allah, says Osman the Young oh, oh!

Osman the Young opened the door to Baghdad,
The enemy fled in front of him oh, oh!...
Here, he fought for three days with his head on his shoulders.
Allah, Allah, says Osman the Young oh, oh!

== See also ==
- Turkish folk music
- Bağlama
- Turkish folklore
- Turkish folk literature
