= Âşık İbretî =

Hıdır Gürel (1920 – 5 November 1976), better known by his pen name Âşık İbretî, was a Turkish ashik, poet and folk singer. His pen name means "the Exemplary Ashik". His poems were written in the tradition of Turkish Alevi folk poetry.

Âşık İbretî composed poetry about politics, Islam, Sufism and love. Âşık Mahzuni Şerif mentioned him as "a progressive and revolutionary minstrel".

== Biography ==
Hıdır Gürel was born in Kırkısrak village of Sarız, Kayseri in 1920 to Ali and Sultan. His ancestry had emigrated from Akçadağ village of Malatya. His mother died when he was 3 years old and his father was married to another woman.

He started working with a shoemaker. He was married to his aunt's daughter, his cousin Sultan when he was 18 years old.

After military service, he went to Afşin, Kahramanmaraş and learned tailoring in a short time. He returned to his hometown Sarız as a tailor. Because of this he is also known as Terzi Hıdır ("Hıdır the Tailor"). In this period, he began playing bağlama and writing poetry.

Other than shoemaking and tailoring, he dealt with many jobs like mining, musical instrument making and amateur dentistry. He went to Elbistan, Kahramanmaraş and started working as a photographer but he couldn't adapt to the city and returned to his hometown. He became famous with his poetry and went to Istanbul.

He died on 5 November 1976 in Istanbul. He had two daughters (Sultan, Gülbeyaz) and four sons (Haydar, Hüseyin, Hıdır, and Kemal). Hıdır died at the age of 34 in 1992. His wife Sultan died in February 2000, his eldest son Haydar in November 2001, his oldest daughter Sultan in December 2006 and his son Kemal on March 24, 2014. His son Hüseyin lives in Balikesir, Turkey, while his daughter Gülbeyaz is living in London, England.

== See also ==
- Turkish folk literature
