= Azat, Armenia =

Village in Gegharkunik, Armenia

Azat Ազատ
- Location within Armenia Location within Gegharkunik
- Coordinates: 40°10′40″N 45°52′18″E
- Country: Armenia
- Province: Gegharkunik
- Municipality: Vardenis
- Elevation: 2,054 m (6,739 ft)

Population (2011)
  - Total: 101
- Time zone: UTC+4 (AMT)

Azat (Armenian: Ազատ) is a village in the Vardenis Municipality of the Gegharkunik Province of Armenia.

== History ==
'Azat' is the Armenian equivalent for 'free.'

Located in the village is a heavily ruined Armenian 11th century church and a pair of medieval khachkars.

The village was the birthplace of Azerbaijani ashik Ashig Alasgar (1821–1926).

== Demographics ==
In the late 19th century, the village comprised "... 15 families of native Armenians as well as 20 others that had resettled there from Khoy, 7 from Bozlukh, and 8 from Bakhshi..."

In 1911, Azat, then known as Agkilisa (Russian: Агкилиса), had a predominantly Tatar (later known as Azerbaijanis) population of 180 within the Nor Bayazet uezd of the Erivan Governorate of the Russian Empire.
