= Miskin Abdal =

Folk poet (1430–1535)

- Born: Səyid Huseyn Muhammed oğlu 1430
- Died: 1535 (aged 104–105)
- Occupations: Folk poet-ashugh, Sufi philosopher-thinker, statesman
- Known for: Founder of the ashugh school, Foreign affairs of the Safavid state
- Notable work: Epic "Miskin Abdal and Senuber," Epic "Shah Ismail and Miskin Abdal," "Lev Sahla Ibrahim," "Orphan Hussein," Azerbaijani minstrel literature

Miskin Abdal (born Səyid Huseyn Muhammed oğlu; 1430–1535) was a folk poet-ashugh, Sufi philosopher-thinker, and statesman, who for many years was in charge of foreign affairs of the Safavid state under Shah Ismail Khatai (1487–1524). He was the founder of the ashugh school.

In Gədəbəy, the "Miskin Abdal" literary assembly has been established.

== Selected works ==
- A dağlar səhifə
- A yaz ayları
- Ayaq üstədi
- Ağlaram
- Ağlaram (Sultanlar əyləşdi nərgiz taхtında)
- Ağrı dağı
- Bundan sənə nə
- Əlif-Lam
- Dağlar
- Dağların
- Dönərmi
- Gedər
- Gedəsiyəm mən
- Qaldı
- Qocaldım
- Məni
- Nökərəm
- Olmaz
- Piriydi
- Ya Əli
