= Ashiqs of Azerbaijan =

Intangible cultural heritage

Azerbaijani Ashiq music
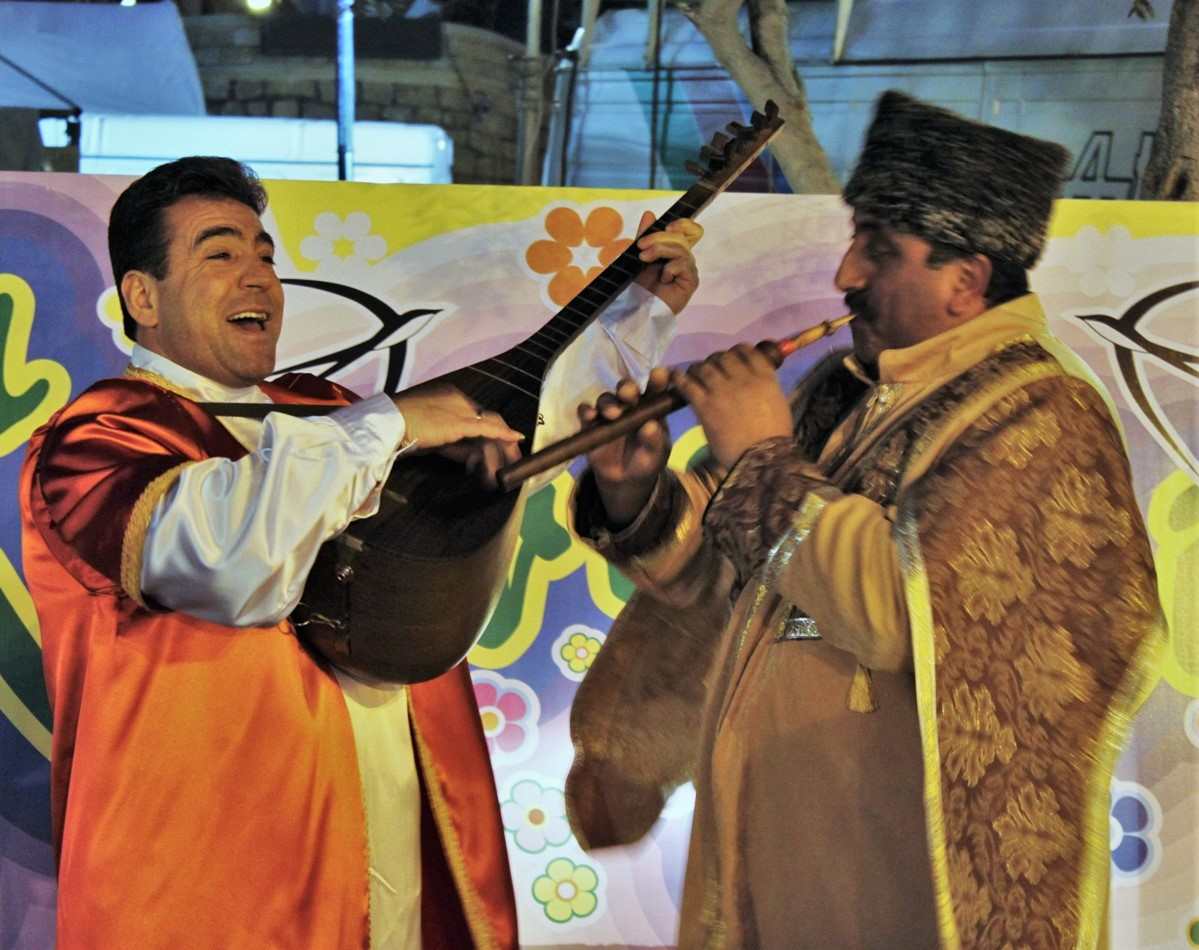
- Azerbaijani ashiqs in Baku
- Stylistic origins: World music
- Cultural origins: ca. 15th – 16th century
- Typical instruments: Saz

Subgenres
- Qoshma, Muhammas, Ustadname, Gifilband, Dastan, Gerayli, Divani, Tajnis

Regional scenes
- Ozan music

Art of Azerbaijani Ashiq
- UNESCO Intangible Cultural Heritage
- Country: Azerbaijan
- Reference: 00253
- Region: Europe and North America

Inscription history
- Inscription: 2008 (4th session)
- List: Representative

The art of Azerbaijani Ashiqs combines poetry, storytelling, dance, and vocal and instrumental music into traditional performance art. This art is one of the symbols of Azerbaijani culture and considered an emblem of national identity in Azerbaijan and the closely related Karapapakh people.

Characterized by the accompaniment of the Saz, a stringed musical instrument, the classical repertoire of Azerbaijani Ashiqs includes 200 songs, 150 literary-musical compositions known as dastans, nearly 2,000 poems, and numerous stories.

Since 2009 the art of Azerbaijani Ashiqs has been inscribed on the Representative List of the Intangible Cultural Heritage of Humanity.

== Etymology ==
In today's encyclopedic dictionaries the word Ashiq, which means "one who is in love", is derived from the Arabic and Persian. Some encyclopedias define Ashiq as a folk singer-poet of Caucasus and neighboring nations. In addition to songs of his own, in repertory, Ashiq includes epic tales and folk songs.

== History ==
=== Early origins ===
The earliest traces of Turkic-speaking ashiqs in general can be found in the 14th century book named Book of Dede Korkut, which contains the most famous epic stories of the Oghuz Turks.

From the 16th century onward, Azerbaijani-speaking ashiqs appeared and they have been the bearers and guardians of the languages they spoke, and the music performed in weddings, parties and folk festivals.

During the 20th century, ashiq performances on concert stages, the radio and television became common.

=== Soviet period (1930–1991) ===
Beginning in the 1930s, the Art of Azerbaijani ashiqs, like all folk music culture of the peoples of the USSR fell under the strictest control of the state government. As Soviet Union highly appreciated the art, during the Cultural Revolution the ashiq art, along with the mugham art of Azerbaijan has been developed while meykhana faced with certain restrictions. In 1938, the first congress of Azerbaijani ashiqs have been held and the large collection of ashiq poetry has been published. Monuments have been made for the ashiqs, their works added to school books and their anniversaries have been celebrated not only in Azerbaijan SSR but also in neighboring Georgian SSR and Armenian SSR, where Ashig Alasgar was born.

=== Modern history and worldwide acceptance (1991–present) ===
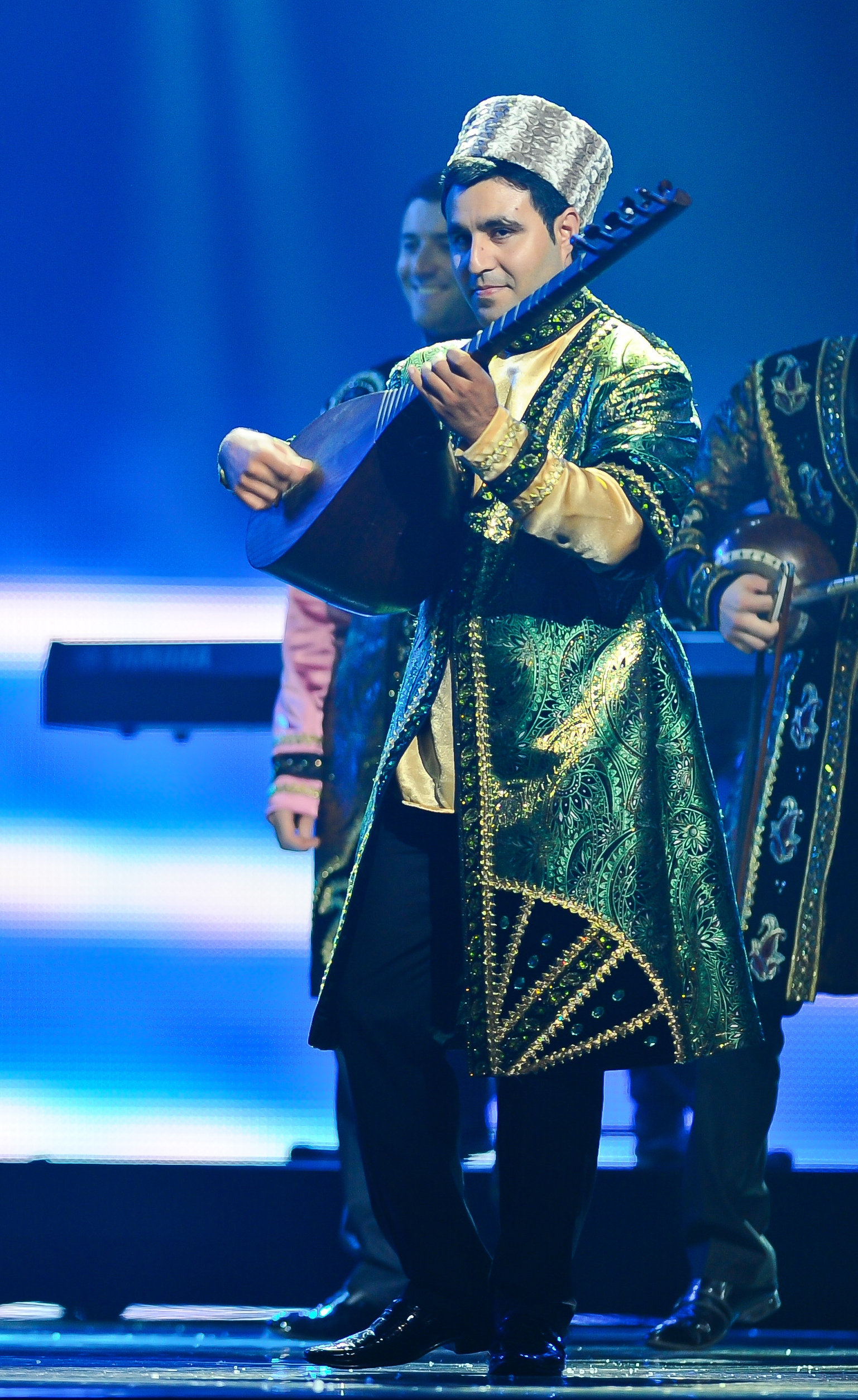
Azerbaijani ashiq

In modern Azerbaijan, professional Ashiqs were divided into two categories: Ashiq-performers and Ashiq-poets. Ashiq-performers, despite being professional storytellers, are not engaged in poetry. Due to their individual abilities and a keen understanding of the specifics of the native folklore, they make different kinds of variations and changes in their epics and legends, especially in their prose.

Ashiq-poets, on the contrary, along with storytelling activities, engaged also in poetry. In Azerbaijan, such Ashiqs were called Ustad, which translates from Persian as a "master". Ashiq-poets have their own schools, where they teach their students the basics of ashiq creativity. Famous Ashiq-poets include such gifted poets as Gurbani, ashiq Abbas from Tufargan, Xəstə Qasım (Hasta Gasym), ashiq Valeh, Ashig Alasgar and many others. They had a tremendous impact not only on ashig poetry but also greatly influenced the written literature of Azerbaijan.

The popular ashigs of modern Azerbaijan include ashiq Zulfiyya, ashiq Nemet Qasimli, ashiq Ahliman, ashiq Adalat, ashiq Kamandar, Ali Tovuzly and ashiq Khanlar. The late Zalimkhan Yagub, member of Parliament of Azerbaijan and Chairman of the Union of Ashiqs through 2015, was also very popular.

After Azerbaijan's independence from the USSR, Art of Azerbaijani ashiqs engaged in the worldwide promotion campaign of Culture of Azerbaijan. The art also received heavy state support, which organized tours for ashiqs around the world.

As of 2009, the total number of Azerbaijani Ashiqs in the world reached 3000 people, which included in UNESCO's Intangible Cultural Heritage list.

== Delivery ==
In Azerbaijan, ashigs' style of performance differ in the specific characteristics of local creativity. For example, each ashig representing the regions of Ganja, Kalbajar, Gazakh, Tovuz and Borchali markedly differ in their individual skill and cherish traditional ashig art. Often performances of ashigs are accompanied by a balaban performer and an ensemble of wind instruments, but the main musical instrument of ashigs is considered to be a saz. The creative abilities of ashigs differ in the following ways:

- Usta-Ashiqs. Poet of the people "Usta ashough (Ashiq-master) – writes the epics, poems, creating songs, sings and plays for the saz and their performance is accompanied by dance movements.
- Ashiq-instrumentalist. This role includes spreading the art of famous Ashiqs, singing and playing the saz, and sometimes dancing.
- Ashiq-narrators are sometimes performed solo or are accompanied by the saz or the duduk player who, while dancing, moves next to him.

== Genres of Azerbaijani Ashiq music ==
The main genres of Azerbaijani Ashiq poetry include the dastan, ustadnameh and their poetic forms. In this case the divan, the gerayli and the tajnis.

=== Goshma ===
Goshma is the most common form of Ashiq folk poetry. The number of syllables in goshma can reach eleven. Goshma itself are also divided into several subgenres such as Gozallama — a form which describes the natural beauty and praises the remarkable properties of human speech, Kochaklama — the form in which the glorification of heroic deeds or the heroes occurs, Tashlama — a genre which criticizes social or human vices, and Agyt — the memorial chant.

=== Dastan ===
Dastan (Persian: داستان "story") is a genre, known not only in Eastern poetry, but also in Western poetry (including traditional folk poetry). In dastans, ashiqs narrates heroic deeds, love stories or important historical events. Stylistic and syllabic relationships are in many ways reminiscent of the goshma genre, but differ from the last number of quatrains, subject, meaning and theme music.

=== Ustadnameh ===
Traditional themes in this genre consist of songs and teachings with moralistic themes.

== Notable Performers ==
=== Individuals ===
==== Female ====
- Ashiq Peri
- Zeynab Zarbaly gyzy
- Ashiq Zulfiyya
- Gulara Azafli
- Ashiq Ulduz
- Ashiq Basti
- Telli Borchaly
- Dilara Azafli

==== Male ====
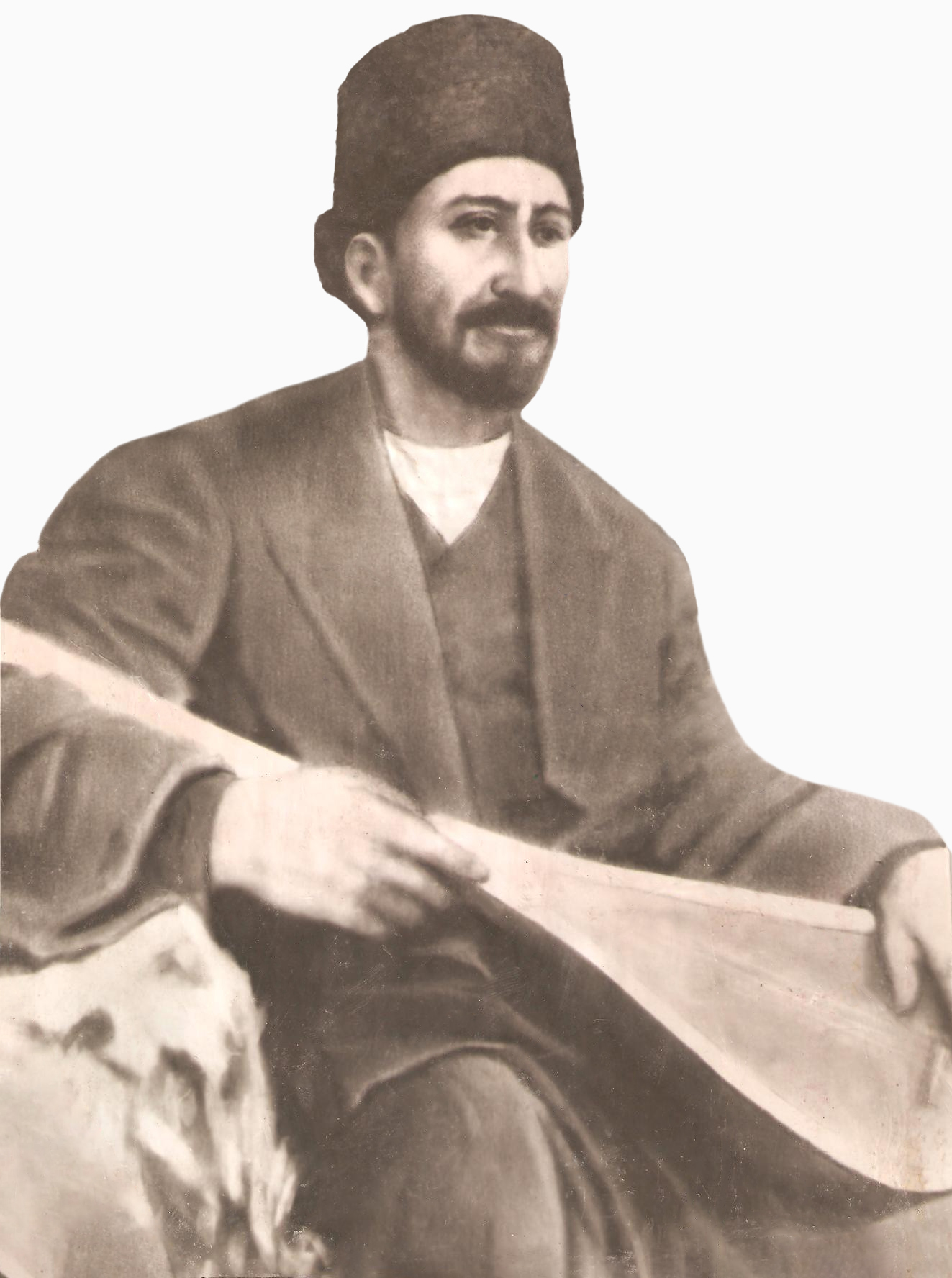
Ashig Alasgar is one of the most highly regarded poet of Azeri folk songs

- Ashiq Ahliman
- Ashig Alasgar
- Alqayıt
- Ashiq Aly
- Ashiq Asad
- Sari Ashiq
- Molla Juma
- Ashiq Qurbani
- Ashiq Islam
- Ashiq Kamandar
- Ashiq Musa
- Ashiq Qarib
- Khasta Qasim
- Ashiq Ali Tapdigogly
- Ashiq Pasha
- Ashiq Panah
- Ashiq Valeh
- Ashiq Yusuf Ohanes
