= Zarnigar Derbentli =

Azerbaijani ashiq

- Born: Unknown Derbent, Derbent Khanate
- Died: 1840 Abdal Gulably village, Karabakh Khanate

Zarnigar Derbentli (Azerbaijani: Zərnigar Dərbəndli; b. second half of the 18th century, Derbent Khanate - 1840, Abdal Gulably village, Karabakh Khanate) is an Azerbaijani female ashiq and one of the prominent representatives of the female ashiq school of Azerbaijan in the 18th - 19th centuries.

== Life ==
Zarnigar Derbentli was born in the second half of the 18th century and died in 1840. It is believed that she was the daughter of Haji Yaqub Bey, one of the nobles of Derbent. She received an excellent education for her time, engaged in horse riding and fencing.

Zarnigar started writing poems from an early age and took part in the deyishme (poetry competition) that are characteristics of Azerbaijani ashiq art. One of her famous deyishme was with Ashiq Loghman Khudatli. Later, she participated in a debate with Ashiq Valeh and was defeated. After this competition, Zarnigar and Valeh fell in love and got married. Zarnigar moved to Karabakh after her marriage.

Ashiq Zarnigar Derbentli died in 1840 in Abdal Gulabli village of modern Aghdam region. After her death, Ashiq Zarnigar was buried in the ancient cemetery in the village where she lived, next to her husband's grave. This poem is written on her headstone:

I am an honest oath of allegiance,
I am the faithful lover's devotion. My homeland is Derbent, my husband is Valeh,
I am Zarnigar, about whom legends have been written.

Original:
Mən vicdanlı sədaqət andıyam,
Mən sadiq aşiqin sədaqətiyəm. Vətənim Dərbənd, ərim Valeh,
Mən haqqında əfsanələr yazılmış Zərnigaram.

== Creativity ==
Ashiq Zarnigar's qoshmas, geraylis, tajnis, mukhammas, qoshayarpaqqoshma, varsagi, etc., written in the form of ashiq poetry as a syllabic verse, have been preserved until today.

The work of Ashiq Zarnigar was reflected in the research work "Azerbaijani literature" published in German in Wiesbaden, by the Azerbaijani scholar Ahmet Caferoğlu in 1964.

The folklorist Salman Mümtaz included examples of Zarnigar Derbentli's literary heritage in his two-volume collection El Şairləri, published in 1927–1928. The collection included works attributed to several female ashugs.

The list of famous works of Zarnigar Haji Yagub gizi, who stands out among Azerbaijani poets from Derbent, includes "Gəl (Come)", "Valeh and Zarnigar" epic, "Taleh və Həqiqət (Fate and Truth)" and "Deyişmələr (poetic competition between Zarnigar and Valeh)" works.

=== "Valeh and Zarnigar" epic ===
The folk epic "Valeh and Zarnigar", one of the most famous examples of Azerbaijani oral folk art, was dedicated to the love of Valeh and Zarnigar. It is often performed not only at ashiq events, but also at weddings, especially in rural areas.
