= Ashig Ali =

Azerbaijani poet

Ashig Ali Aşıq Alı
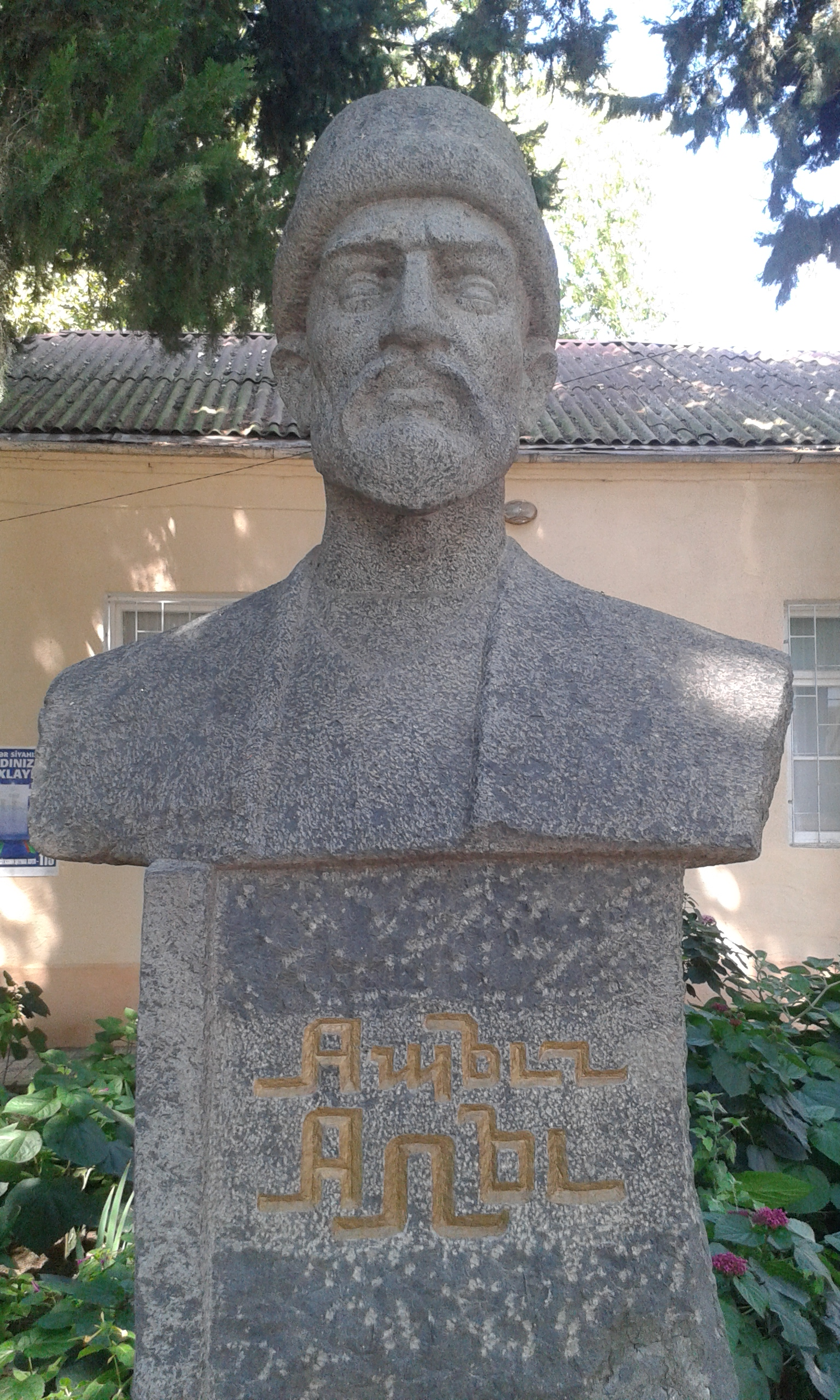
- Ali's statue in Agstafa

Background information
- Born: 1801; Gizilvang, Erivan Khanate
- Died: 1911 (aged 109–110); Gizilveng, Basarkechar, Yeni Bayazid uezd, Erivan Governorate, Russian Empire
- Occupation: ashiq
- Instrument: saz

Ashig Ali (Azerbaijani: عاشق علی, Aşıq Alı, 1801–1911) was one of the representatives of 19th century Azerbaijani ashiq poetry.

== Biography ==
Ashig Ali was born in 1801 in Gizilveng village of Goycha District. In several sources, including the writings of Farman Karimzade, Shamil Asgarov and Ali Amirov, it is mentioned that he is a Kurd. According to Nazir Ahmadli, Ashig Ali was either a Kurdish or an Ayrum by origin. Researcher Mashallah Khudubeyli called these ideas "provocative" and added that Ashıg Ali was originally from Goycha.

He started ashig music at the age of 16-17 and became famous in a short time. He had many students. The most famous of them is Ashig Alasgar, one of the well-known representatives of 19th century Azerbaijani ashig poetry.

Ashig Ali wrote poems in such genres as garayli, qoshma, tajnis, divani, and mukhammas. All of Ashig Ali's poems have not yet been published as a collection, but individual poems have been published.

He died in 1911 in the same village where he was born.

== Ashig Ali-210 ==
On February 28, 2011, a jubilee concert dedicated to the 210th anniversary of the birth of Ashig Ali was held at the Heydar Aliyev Palace under the joint organization of the Ministry of Culture and Tourism of the Republic of Azerbaijan and the Azerbaijan Ashiqs Union.
