= Khasta Qasim =

- Born: 1684; Tekmeh Dash, Eastern Azerbaijan, Iran
- Died: 1760 (aged 75–76); Shamakhi, Shirvan (modern-day Azerbaijan)
- Occupation: Poet

Khasta Qasim (Azerbaijani: Xəstə Qasım, Persian: خسته قاسم: 1684–1760) – was an Iranian Azerbaijani poet of Azerbaijani literature. Khasta Qasim was one of the best Azerbaijani-language poets; he was also a mystic, ashik, and philosopher in the era of Afsharid Iran (18th century), popularly known as Dada and Gasim.

Khasta Gasim was born about 1680 in the village of Tikmedash, near Tabriz in one of the most educated families in Tabriz, which is evident from the preserved poetic heritage of the poet. In the 17th century, such forms of folk art, as Ashik poetry and art were widely distributed not only in Tabriz, but also in the surrounding area. Since childhood, Gasim was interested in poetry. He learned the Arabic and Persian languages and mastered the arts of poetry, philosophy, history, Islam, and astronomy. Gasim also studied the literary heritage of Fuzûlî, and thought of himself as his descendant.

Gasim studied the experience of previous masters such as Dede Korkut, Shirvanly mall Gasim, Gharib, Ashiq Qurbani, Ashik Abbas Tufarqanlı, creating poetry, and took part in polishing and improving the linguistic and stylistic delivery of the Epic of Koroghlu. In connection with the invasion in 1734 the troops of Nadir Shah and the conquest of Tabriz, many poets and their families were evicted.

Khasta Gasim permanently settled in Shamakhi and thereafter lived in Shirvan. Also, for some time he lived at the court of one of the Shirvan Khanate - Garakhan. During a trip to Derbent, Dede Gasim met Ashug Lezgi Ahmed. It is well known among poets held a contest where both sides exchanged poems, riddles ("deyishme").

== Notes ==
- Tikmədaşlı Xəstə Qasım in «Mədəniyyət» newspaper 25.07.2012 (in Azerbaijani)
- Kara Namazov, candidate of philological sciences. Azerbaijan ashik poetry. Khasta Gasim. - Baku: Yazichi, 1984. - 40
