= Abbas and Gulgaz =

Azerbaijani love dastan

- by Folk (based on the poems of the ashig Abbas Tufarganly)
- Original title: Azerbaijani: Abbas və Gülgəz)
- Language: Azerbaijani language
- Genre(s): dastan
- Publication date: 17th century (presumably)

"Abbas and Gulgaz" (Azerbaijani: Abbas və Gülgəz) is an Azerbaijani love dastan based on the poems of the ashig Abbas Tufarganly. Presumably, the dastan was composed in the 17th century. It tells about the love of the ashig Abbas for a girl named Gulgaz.

The dastan tells about the campaign of the Shah Abbas I on the territory of Azerbaijan, who takes Gulgaz with him by force. Ashig Abbas, suffering from being separated from his beloved, bypasses various obstacles until he is finally reunited with his beloved.

In the dastan "Abbas and Gulgaz" there are tense waiting scenes and epic images full of lyricism. The dastan "Abbas and Gulgaz" is a classic example of a medieval Azerbaijani love dastan. The dastan is performed by ashigs. There are several versions of the dastan.
