= Sheykh Hoseynlu =

Sheykh Hoseynlu شيخ‌حسينلو
- Village
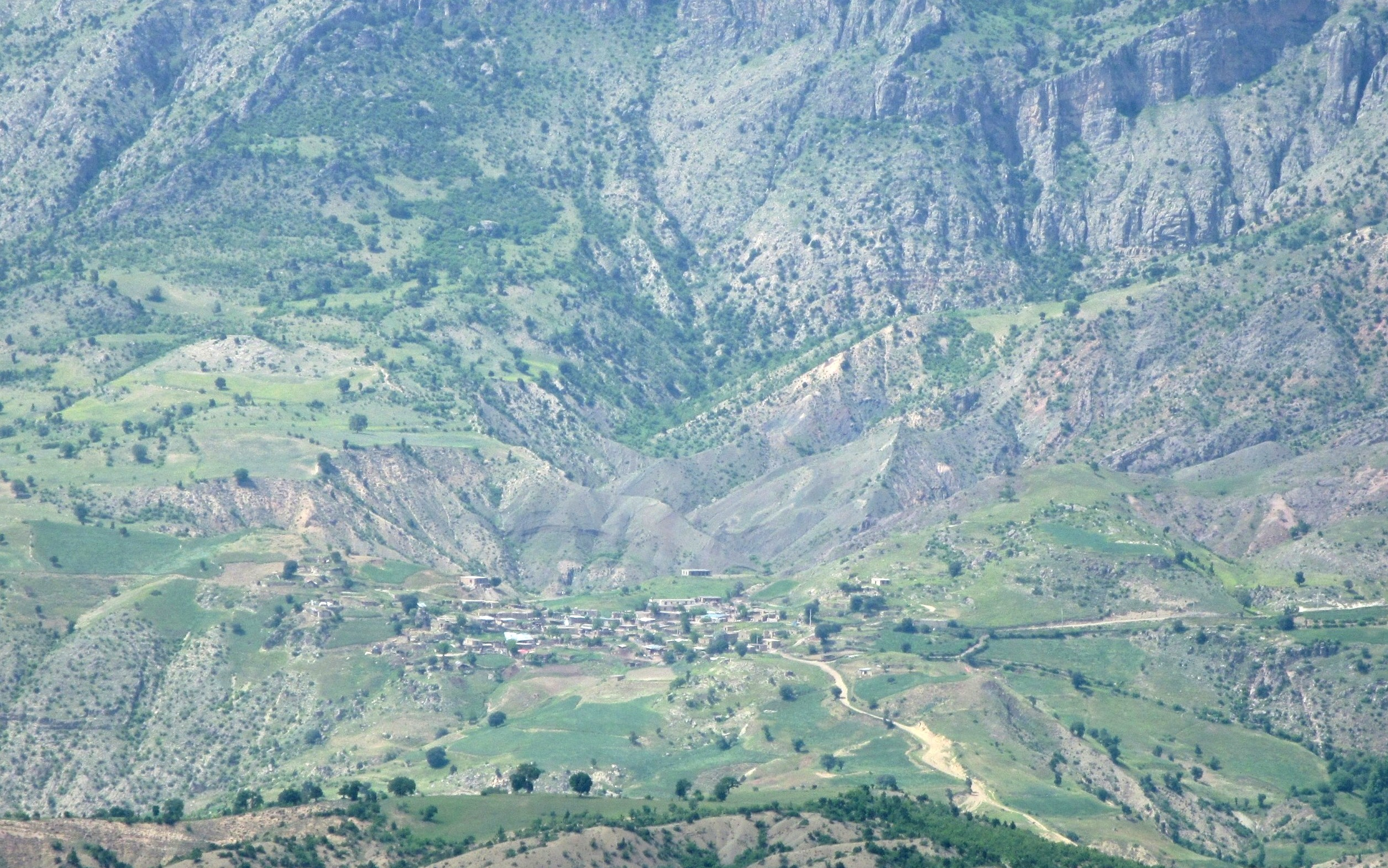
- Sheykh Hoseynlu in June 2011

- Location within Iran
- Coordinates: 38°56′56″N 46°49′45″E
- Country: Iran
- Province: East Azerbaijan
- County: Khoda Afarin
- Bakhsh: Minjavan
- Rural District: Minjavan-e Gharbi

Population (2006)
  - Total: 131
- Time zone: UTC+3:30 (IRST)
  - Summer (DST): UTC+4:30 (IRDT)

Sheykh Hoseynlu (Persian: شيخ‌حسينلو, also Romanized as Sheykh Ḩoseynlū; also known as Shaikh Husain, Sheykh Ḩasanlū, Sheykh Ḩoseyn, and Shikhuseyn) is a village in Minjavan-e Gharbi Rural District, Minjavan District, Khoda Afarin County, East Azerbaijan Province, Iran. At the 2006 census, its population was 131, in 34 families.
