= Aşıq Ümer =

Crimean Tatar poet (1621–1707)

Ümer Abdula oğlu
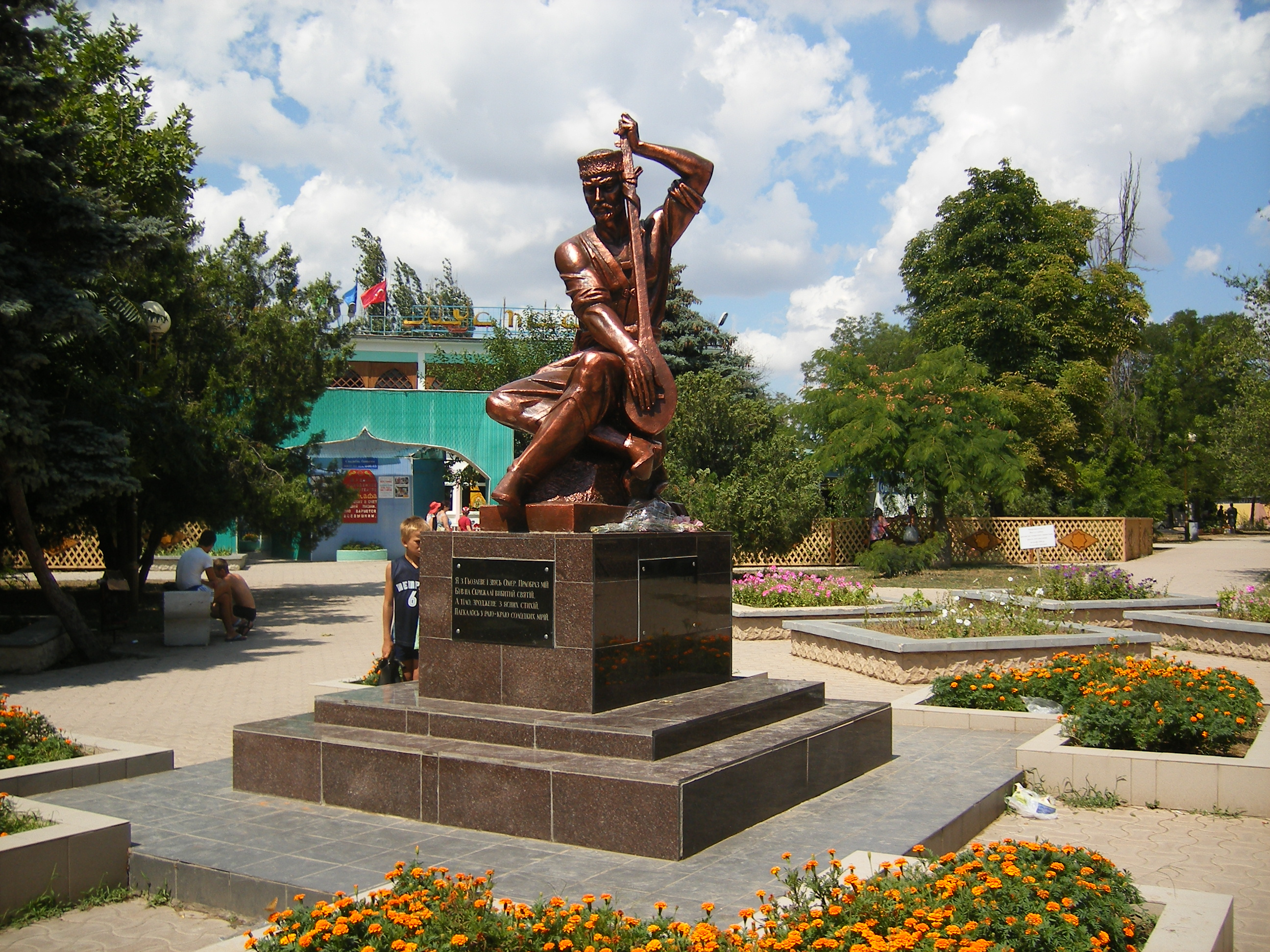
- Statue of Aşıq Ümer in Yevpatoria
- Born: 1621; Kezlev, Crimean Khanate (now Yevpatoria, Crimea)
- Died: 1707 (aged 85–86); Kezlev, Crimean Khanate (now Yevpatoria, Crimea)
- Citizenship: Crimean Khanate
- Writing career
- Pen name: Aşıq Ümer, Ümer Kezlevli
- Genres: ashik poetry, bağlama poetry, ghazal, rubaʿi
- Subjects: mystical content, soldier's theme

Aşıq Ümer (1621–1707) was a Crimean Tatar medieval poet of ashik and is one of the most famous representatives of the Turkic-speaking ashik poetry in general. Ashik poetry (Crimean Tatar: aşıq; lit. 'the person in love') is a special kind of literary oeuvre, the representatives of which – folk poets-singers – accompany their performances with playing the string-plucked musical instrument bağlama. Hence another name for this poetry – "bağlama poetry".

He wrote mainly lyric poems (on mystical content and related to a soldier's theme) in the forms of Turkic folk poetry. Aşıq Ümer is also an author of poems that are traditional for classical oriental poetry – ghazals, rubaʿi etcetera. He greatly influenced the later poets-improvisers (ashiks).

== Sources ==
- Ergun, Sadettin Nüzhet, Aşık Ömer. Hayatı ve şiirleri, Istanbul, 1936; Banarlı, Nihat Sami, Resimli Türk edebiyatı tarihi, Istanbul, 1949.
- Ашик Омер. Краткая литературная энциклопедия. Т. 1. — 1962
- Ашик Умер – самый известный в мире крымский певец любви — Крым.Реалии // RFEL
- Mustafa Altuğ Yayla Yüzyıl osmanlı imparatorluğunda aşık ömer ve popüler kültür — Hacettepe Üniversitesi Sosyal Bilimler Enstitüsü // Ankara, 2013
