= Erzurumlu Emrah =

Erzurumlu Emrah (1775, Güzelyurt, Erzurum – 1854, Niksar, Tokat) was a Turkic folk poet from the Ottoman Empire. The name literally means "Emrah from Erzurum".

== Life ==
He took a madrasah education in Erzurum. He was interested in mysticism and adhered to the Halidi branch of Nakşibendi, lived in Sivas and Kastamonu for a long time. Important figures of poetic literature of the time were Karacaoğlan, Atik Ömer, Erzurumlu Emrah and Kayserili Aşık Seyrani. Erzurumlu Emrah is believed to have died in 1854 in Niksar. His poems of the aruz were published by Erzurumlu Abdulaziz under the title Divan.

El çek tabib el çek yaram üstünden
Sen benim derdime deva bilmezsin
Sen nasıl tabibsin yoktur ilacın
Yaram yürektedir sarabilmezsin

Sana derim sana ey kalbi hayın
Kimseler çekmesin feleğin yayın
Yıkıp harab ettin gönül sarayın
Alıp bir taşını koyabilmezsin

Emrah'ım dinledin benim sözlerim
Muhabettin can evimde gizlerim
Ne duruyon ağlasana gözlerim
Bir daha yarini görebilmezsin

Translation:

Get your hand away from my wound, doctor!
You don´t know the cure of my pain
What kind of a doctor are you? You don't have medicine.
My wound is on my heart, you can´t bandage it.

I say you, o false-hearted!
May nobody pull the string of fate's bow
You demolished and destroyed the palace of heart.
You can´t take and put back even one stone of it.

I am Emrah, you listened to my words.
I hide your love in home of my heart:
Why do you stop, cry my eyes.
You can't see the beloved one more time.

== Influence ==
His name had led to the increase of the popularity of the given name Emrah, which was being replaced by a different transliteration, "Emre"

== See also ==
- Turkish folk literature
