= Ashik Abbas Tufarqanlı =

Azerbaijani poet

Abbas Tufarqanlı
- Born: Late 16th century Azarshahr, Iran
- Died: Unknown
- Occupation: Ashik

Abbas Tufarqanlı or Abbas Divarganli, or Abbas of Tufargan (Azerbaijani: Aşıq Abbas Tufarqanlı, Persian: عاشیق عباس توفارقانلی, Turkish: Aşık Tufarganlı Abbas), was a 17th-century Azerbaijani ashik. He is regarded as one of the most prominent ashiks in contemporary history.

Abbas Tufarqanlı was born sometime in the late 16th century in Azarshahr, a town near Tabriz which was then known as Tufarqan. His biography is shrouded in the background of the folk story, Abbas and Gülgez, which is set in the court of Safavid Shah Abbas (1587–1629), where Ashik Abbas quests to win his beloved Gülgez from the king. Abbas achieves his goal by convincing the ruler that he (Ashik Abbas) was a divinely inspired ashik. This episode is a renowned instance of dream motif in Turkish hikaye.

== Abbas Tufarqanlı's compositions ==
He was a renowned composer and some of his works have survived and are still sung by many contemporary ashiks to this day. One of his works is the following:

Ay həzarət, bir zamana gəlibdir,
Ala qarğa şux tərlanı bəyənməz
Oğullar atanı, qızlar anani,
Gəlinlər də qaynananı bəyənməz
Adam var, dağları gəzər sərsəri,
Adam var, geyinər pustinən dəri,
Adam var, mərfətdən yoxdur xəbəri,
Adam var, soltanı, xanı bəyənməz.
...
Adam var dəstinə verərsən güllər,
Adam var, gözünə çəkəsən millər,
Tufarqanlı Abbas, başına küllər,
Nə günə qalmısan, qarı bəyənməz.

Translation:

Oh brothers and sisters, what have we come to:
The jay hates the eagle as never before.
Sons hate their fathers, daughters- their mothers,
And daughters-in-law hate their mothers-in-law.
Some people like vagabonds roam in the mountains,
Some wear clothes of leather- a sin in effect.
Some people know nothing of tact and good manners,
While others pay sultans and khans no respect..
...
There are people whom you would like present with flowers.
There are people whom you would like to blind their eyes.
O Abbas Tufarghan, what have you come to:
Your old woman declares she doesn't like you!
