= Dadaloğlu =

Ottoman-Turkish folk poet (1785–1868)

- Veli
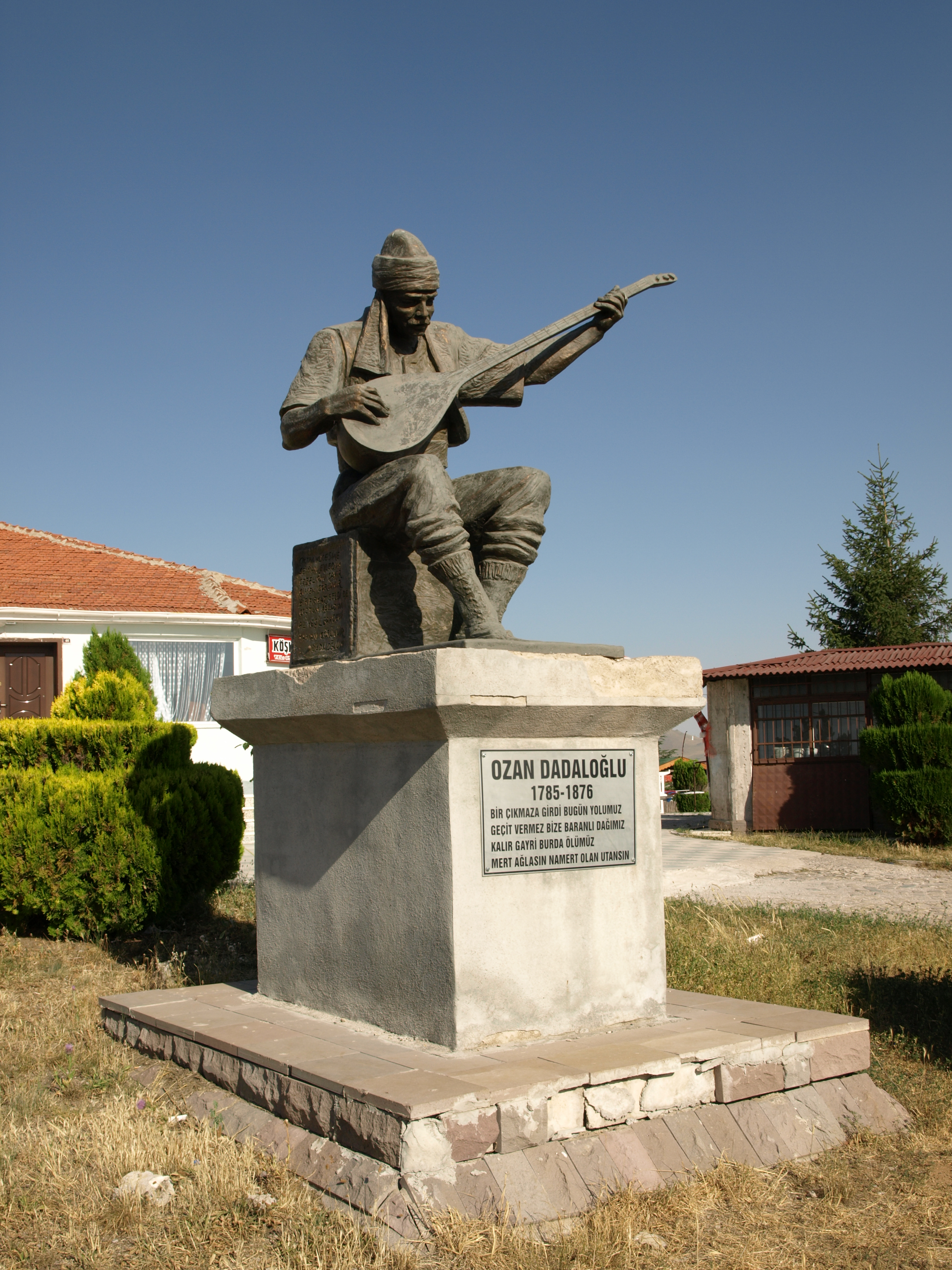
- Dadaloğlu's statue in Kaman, Kırşehir
- Born: 1785 CE (approximate); Tomarza, Ottoman Empire now Turkey
- Died: 1868 CE (approximate); Kaman, Ottoman Empire now Turkey
- Occupation: Ashik
- Era: Ottoman

Dadaloğlu (Veli) (1785 ?–1868 ?) was a Turkish Ottoman, a folk poet-singer, known as ozan (bard).

== Background ==
Two distinct literatures existed in the Ottoman Empire. Literature of the palace, so called divan literature used Ottoman Turkish, a language which extensively borrowed words and phrases from Persian and Arabic. This language was not used in daily speech and was not intelligible for most of the population. Conversely, the folklore literature used everyday language which was Turkish with a minimum number of words borrowed from other languages. The best known examples of folklore literature were poems named koşma. A special type of koşma was varsağı which can be described as epic koşma.

== Biography ==
Dadaloğlu lived in the mountainous areas of south Anatolia (Nur Mountains and possibly Toros Mountains). His name was Veli. Dadaloğlu was his mahlas (pseudonym). He was a member of a nomadic Turkmen tribe named Afshar tribe. Ottoman government in the first half of the nineteenth century decided to settle down the nomadic tribes to end the tension between the nomadic tribes and the settled people. They were given agricultural land. But most of the tribe members preferred traditional nomadic life style and struggled against the Ottoman high commander. Dadaloğlu was also in the struggle and in his varsağı poems, he reflected the feelings and the reactions of his people. In his verse,

Ferman padişahın, Dağlar bizimdir...
Decree is Sultan's, mountains are ours...

After a period of struggle, finally Ottoman government persuaded most of the tribes to adopt a sedentary life. The new home was in Central Anatolia. Dadaloğlu died in the village of Ziyaret Tepe in Kaman district of Kirsehir Province.

== Style ==
Although he is known as a varsağı poet, he also produced koşmas in other types. He usually used 8 or 11 syllabic meter. As it is true with other folk poets he used his pseudonym in the last verse.
