= Ashiq Qarib =

Anonymous romantic story

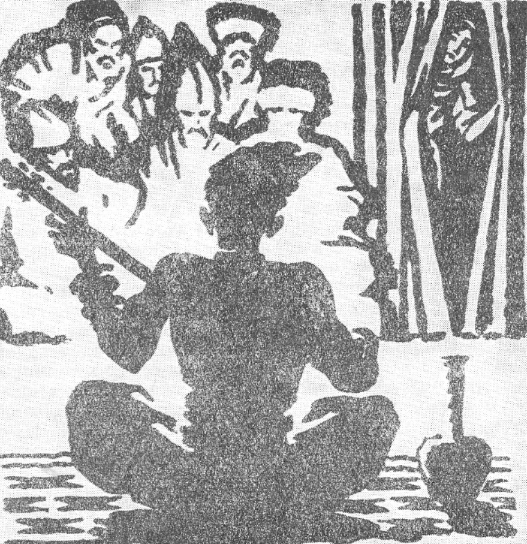
Ashiq Qarib

Ashiq Qarib (Azerbaijani: Aşıq Qərib, literally "the wandering ashik") is an anonymous romantic dastan, composed not earlier than the 16—17th centuries and popular in Transcaucasia and Central Asia. The verses, which are incorporated into the prose, are ascribed to the eponymous hero, a wandering Ashik who began his journeys with worldly love and attains wisdom by travelling and learning then achieving sainthood. The original Azerbaijani version was first recorded by Mikhail Lermontov in 1837 and was published in 1846. In 1915 Azerbaijani composer Zulfugar Hajibeyov wrote an opera Ashiq Qarib.

The dastan is popular in Asia Minor and Middle Asia. The Turkish version assumed the form of cycles (Son of Ashik-Garip and Grandson of Ashik-Garip). The Turkmen version (Shasenem and Garib) abounds in ethnic details and historical names.

The story of Ashiq Qarib has been the main feature of a movie with the same name by director and producer Sergei Parajanov.
