= Turkish folk literature =

Oral tradition of Turkish people

Turkish folk literature is an oral tradition deeply rooted, in its form, in Anatolian traditions. However, in its themes, Turkish folk literature reflects the problems peculiar to a settling (or settled) people who have abandoned the nomadic lifestyle. One example of this is the series of folktales surrounding the figure of Keloğlan, a young boy beset with the difficulties of finding a wife, helping his mother to keep the family house intact, and dealing with the problems caused by his neighbors. Another example is the rather mysterious figure of Nasreddin, a trickster figure who often plays jokes, of a sort, on his neighbors.

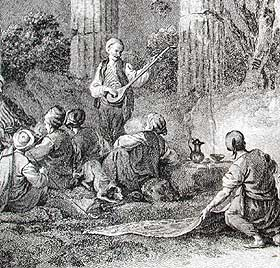
An aşık performing in Anatolia, from an 18th-century Western engraving

Nasreddin also reflects another significant change that had occurred between the days when the Turkish people were nomadic and the days when they had largely become settled in Anatolia; namely, Nasreddin is a Muslim imam. The Turkish people had first become an Islamic people sometime around the 9th or 10th century CE, and the religion henceforth came to exercise an enormous influence on their society and literature; particularly the heavily mystically oriented Sufi and Shi'a varieties of Islam. The Sufi influence, for instance, can be seen clearly not only in the tales concerning Nasreddin but also in the works of Yunus Emre, a towering figure in Turkish literature and a poet who lived at the end of the 13th and beginning of the 14th century CE, probably in the Karamanid state in south-central Anatolia. The Shi'a influence, on the other hand, can be seen extensively in the tradition of the aşıks, or ozans, who are roughly akin to medieval European minstrels and who traditionally have had a strong connection with the Alevi faith, which can be seen as something of a homegrown Turkish variety of Shi'a Islam. However, in Turkish culture such a neat division into Sufi and Shi'a is scarcely possible: for instance, Yunus Emre is considered by some to have been an Alevi, while the entire Turkish aşık/ozan tradition is permeated with the thought of the Bektashi Sufi order, which is itself a blending of Shi'a and Sufi concepts. The word aşık (literally, "lover") is in fact the term used for first-level members of the Bektashi order.

Because the Turkish folk literature tradition extends in a more or less unbroken line from about the 10th or 11th century CE to today, it is perhaps best to consider the tradition from the perspective of genre. There are three basic genres in the tradition: epic; folk poetry; and folklore.

== The epic tradition ==
The Turkish epic tradition properly begins with the Book of Dede Korkut, which is in a language recognizably similar to modern Turkish and which developed from the oral traditions of the Oghuz Turks, that branch of the Turkic peoples which migrated towards western Asia and eastern Europe through Transoxiana beginning in the 9th century CE. The Book of Dede Korkut continued to survive in the oral tradition after the Oghuz Turks had, by and large, settled in Anatolia.

The Book of Dede Korkut was the primary element of the Turkish epic tradition in Anatolia for several centuries. Another epic circulating at the same time, however, was the so-called Epic of Köroğlu, which concerns the adventures of Rüşen Ali ("Köroğlu", or "son of the blind man") to exact revenge for the blinding of his father. The origins of this epic are somewhat more mysterious than those of the Book of Dede Korkut: many believe it to have arisen in Anatolia sometime between the 15th and 17th centuries CE; more reliable testimony, though, seems to indicate that the story is nearly as old as that of the Book of Dede Korkut, dating from around the dawn of the 11th century CE. Complicating matters somewhat is the fact that Köroğlu is also the name of a poet of the aşık/ozan tradition.

That the epic tradition in Turkish literature may not have died out entirely can be seen from the Epic of Shaykh Bedreddin (Şeyh Bedreddin Destanı), published in 1936 by the poet Nâzım Hikmet Ran (1901–1963). This long poem—which concerns an Anatolian shaykh's rebellion against the Ottoman Sultan Mehmed I—is a sort of modern, written epic that nevertheless draws upon the same independent-minded traditions of the Anatolian people that can be seen in the Epic of Köroğlu. Also, many of the works of the 20th-century novelist Yaşar Kemal (1923–2015), such as his long 1955 novel Memed, My Hawk (İnce Memed), can be considered modern prose epics.

== Folk poetry ==
The folk poetry tradition in Turkish literature, as indicated above, was strongly influenced by the Islamic Sufi and Shi'a traditions. Furthermore, as partly evidenced by the prevalence of the aşık/ozan tradition—which is still alive today—the dominant element in Turkish folk poetry has always been song.

There are, broadly speaking, two traditions of Turkish folk poetry:

- the aşık/ozan tradition, which—although much influenced by religion, as mentioned above—was for the most part a secular tradition;
- the explicitly religious tradition, which emerged from the gathering places (tekkes) of the Sufi religious orders and Shi'a groups.

Much of the poetry and song of the aşık/ozan tradition, being almost exclusively oral until the 19th century CE, remains anonymous. There are, however, a few well-known aşıks from before that time whose names have survived together with their works: the aforementioned Köroğlu (16th century CE); Karacaoğlan (1606?–1689?), who may be the best-known of the pre-19th century aşıks; Dadaloğlu (1785?–1868?), who was one of the last of the great aşıks before the tradition began to dwindle somewhat in the late 19th century; and several others. The aşıks were essentially minstrels who travelled through Anatolia performing their songs on the bağlama, a mandolin-like instrument whose paired strings are considered to have a symbolic religious significance in Alevi/Bektashi culture. Despite the decline of the aşık/ozan tradition in the 19th century, it experienced a significant revival in the 20th century thanks to such outstanding figures as Aşık Veysel Şatıroğlu (1894–1973), Aşık Mahzuni Şerif (1938–2002), Neşet Ertaş (1938–2012), and many others.

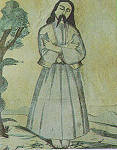
Kaygusuz Abdal

The tradition of tekke literature shared a similar basis with the aşık/ozan tradition in that the poems were generally intended to be sung, generally in religious gatherings, making them somewhat akin to Western hymns (Turkish ilahi). One major difference from the aşık/ozan tradition, however, is that—from the very beginning—the poems of the tekke tradition were written down. This was because they were produced by revered religious figures in the literate environment of the tekke, as opposed to the milieu of the aşık/ozan tradition, where the majority could not read or write. The major figures in the tradition of tekke literature are: Yunus Emre (1240?–1320?), who is one of the most important figures in all of Turkish literature; Süleyman Çelebi (?–1422), who wrote a highly popular long poem called Vesiletü'n-Necat ("The Means of Salvation", but more commonly known as the Mevlid), concerning the birth of the Islamic prophet Muhammad; Kaygusuz Abdal (1397–?), who is widely considered the founder of Alevi/Bektashi literature; and Pir Sultan Abdal (?–1560), whom many consider to be the pinnacle of that literature.

== Folklore ==
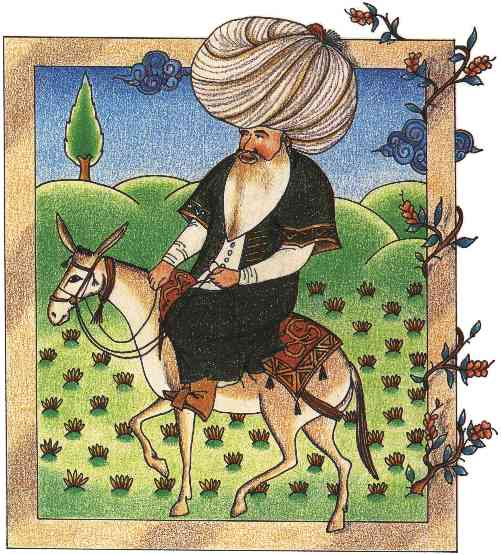
Nasreddin Hoca

The tradition of folklore—folktales, jokes, legends, and the like—in the Turkish language is very rich. Perhaps the most popular figure in the tradition is the aforementioned Nasreddin (known as Nasreddin Hoca, or "teacher Nasreddin", in Turkish), who is the central character of thousands of jokes. He generally appears as a person who, though seeming somewhat stupid to those who must deal with him, actually proves to have a special wisdom all his own:

One day, Nasreddin's neighbor asked him, "Teacher, do you have any forty-year-old vinegar?"—"Yes, I do," answered Nasreddin.—"Can I have some?" asked the neighbor. "I need some to make an ointment with."—"No, you can't have any," answered Nasreddin. "If I gave my forty-year-old vinegar to whoever wanted some, I wouldn't have had it for forty years, would I?"

Similar to the Nasreddin jokes, and arising from a similar religious milieu, are the Bektashi jokes, in which the members of the Bektashi religious order—represented through a character simply named Bektaşi—are depicted as having an unusual and unorthodox wisdom, one that often challenges the values of Islam and of society.

Another popular element of Turkish folklore is the shadow theater centered around the two characters of Karagöz and Hacivat, who both represent stock characters: Karagöz—who hails from a small village—is something of a country bumpkin, while Hacivat is a more sophisticated city-dweller. Popular legend has it that the two characters are actually based on two real persons who worked for Osman I—the founder of the Ottoman dynasty—in the construction of his palace at Bursa in the early 14th century CE. The two workers supposedly spent much of their time entertaining the other workers, and were so funny and popular that they interfered with work on the palace, and were subsequently put to death.

== Authors ==
- Yunus Emre
- Haji Bektash Veli
- Pir Sultan Abdal
- Karacaoğlan
- Dadaloğlu
- Erzurumlu Emrah
- Aşık Veysel Şatıroğlu
