= Kul Nesîmî =

17th-century Turkish poet

Personal life
- Era: Ottoman

Religious life
- Religion: Shia Islam (Twelver or Alevi-Bektashi)

Senior posting
- Period in office: 17th century
- Influenced by: Imadaddin Nasimi, Pir Sultan Abdal, Ismail I

Kul Nesîmî, or simply Nesîmî, real name Ali was an Ottoman Alevi-Bektashi poet, who lived in the 17th century in Anatolia.

Very little is known about this poet except that certain political events found an expression in his poetry, such as Ottoman conquest of Baghdad in 1640. He wrote in the same tradition as such earlier poets as Nasimi, with whom he is frequently confused, as well as in the tradition of Ismail I and Pir Sultan Abdal.

Turkish lyrics	English translation
Ben melâmet hırkasını kendim giydim eğnime (eynime) Âr u nâmus şişesini taşa çaldım kime ne Gâh çıkarım gökyüzüne seyrederim âlemi Gâh inerim yeryüzüne seyreder âlem beni Gâh giderim medreseye ders okurum Hak için Gâh giderim meyhaneye dem çekerim aşk için Sofular haram demişler aşkımın şarabına (Sofular haram demişler bu aşkın bâdesine) Ben doldurur ben içerim günah benim kime ne Sofular secde ederler meclisin mihrabına Benim ol dost eşiğidir secdegâhım kime ne Nesimî’ye sordular kim yarin ile hoş musun (Nesimî’ye sormuşlar yarin ile hoş musun) Hoş olam ya olmayayım ol yar benim kime ne (Hoş olayım olmayayım o yar benim kime ne)	I put the coat of reproach on my back myself Smashed the bottle of dignity on the ground, whose concern is it Sometimes I climb up to the sky, I watch the world from above Sometimes I come down on earth, and the world watches me Sometimes I visit the madrasah, study a lesson for God's sake Sometimes I visit the wine house, sip a drink for love's sake The puritans said "forbidden" to the wine of my love I fill in the cup, I drink, sin is mine, whose concern is it The devout bow to prayer before the mihrab of the congregation My place of worship is the friends house, whose concern is it They ask Nesimi, are you happy with your lover I am happy or not happy, she is my lover, whose concern is it
