= Karacaoğlan =

Turkic folk poet and ashik (c. 1606 – 1679)

Karacaoğlan was a 17th-century Anatolian Turkish folk poet and ashik. His exact dates of birth and death are unknown but it is widely accepted that he was born around 1606 and died around 1679. He lived around the city of Osmaniye. His tomb, which was organized as a mausoleum in 1997, is at Karacaoğlan hill in the village of Karacaoğlan, Mut, Mersin. In this regard, he was the first known folk poet and ashik whose statue was built.

His poetry gave a vivid picture of nature and village life in Anatolian settlements. This kind of folk poetry, as distinct from the poetry of the Ottoman palace, was emphasized after the foundation of the Republic of Turkey in 1923 and became an important influence on modern lyric poetry, with Karacaoğlan being its foremost exponent.

== Biography ==
There is very little known about his life. Some say he was born near Mount Kozan, near a village called Varsak. Others suggest that he is from the village of the same name, but in modern-day Osmaniye, and some suggest he lived in Kahramanmaras. The Barak tribe of Gaziantep as well as the Çavuşlu tribe of Kilis claim he is from their town. Most, however, believe that he was born near Çukurova and lived among the Turkish tribes in that mountainous region of southern Anatolia. Karacaoğlan was his pseudonym. His real name is thought to be Simayil, İsmail, Halil or Hasan. According to Hodja Hamdi Efendi of Akşehir, he was an orphan. He left town at an early age. In some of his poetry it is indicated that he took two of his sisters all the way to Bursa or Istanbul. He spent most of his life in Çukurova and Maraş. Even though not known with certainty, it is believed that he died in modern-day Kahramanmaraş.

The topics of his poetry reflect the nature in which he was embedded, along with the Turkish nomadic culture of the Toros mountains of which he was a part. The main themes of this poetry stemmed out of nature, love, longing for home, and death. As with other Turkish folk poetry of his time in Anatolia, his language was expressive, yet unadorned, direct, and simple.

== See also ==
- Yunus Emre
- List of Turkic languages poets
- Turna
