= Ashig Alasgar =

Azeri mystic troubadour poet (1821–1936)

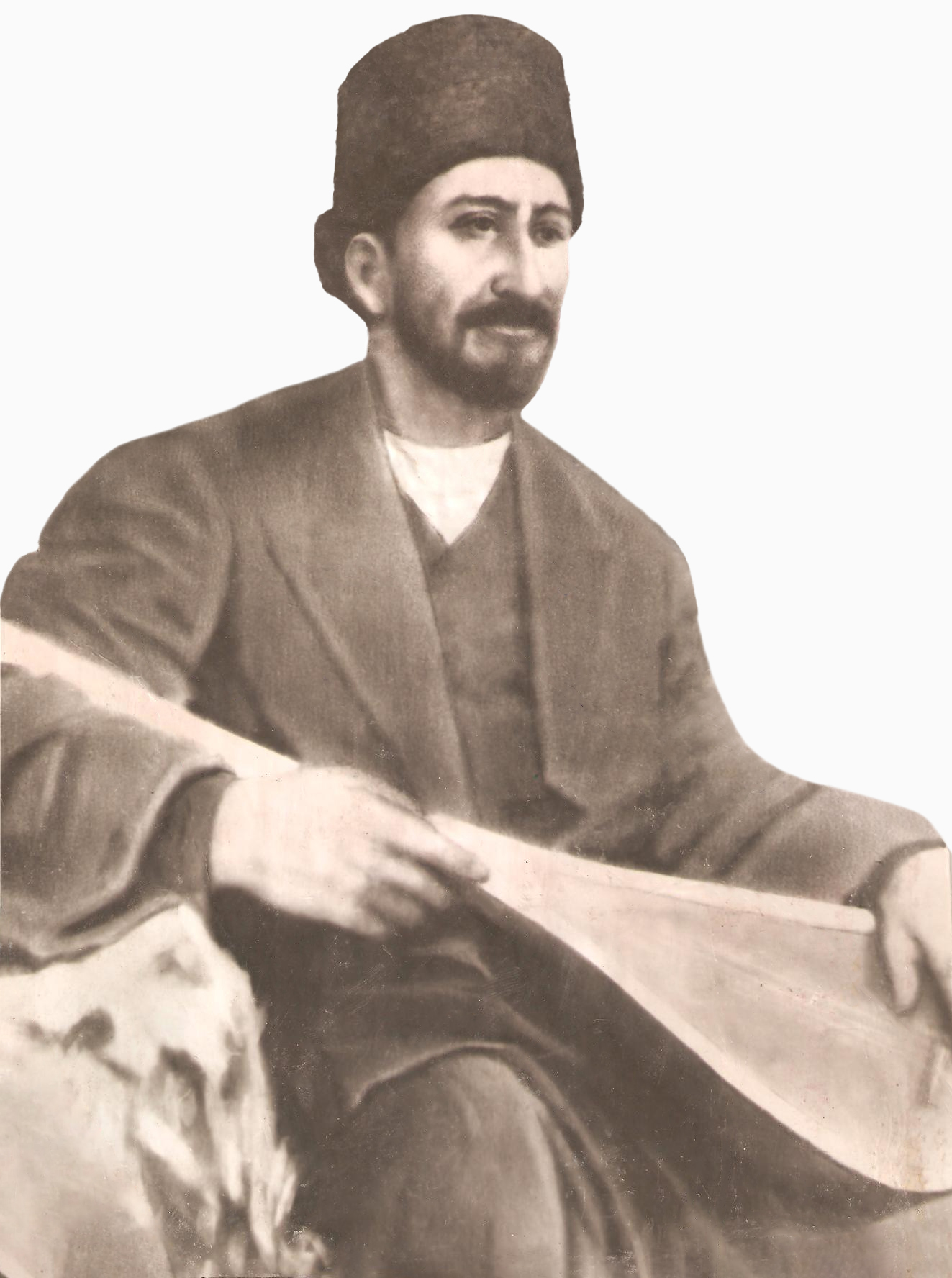
- Born: Alasgar Almammed oghlu March 22, 1821; Aghkilsa, Erivan Khanate
- Died: March 7, 1926 (aged 104); Aghkilsa, Nor Bayazet uezd, Armenian SSR, Soviet Union
- Website: dede-alesker.com

Alasgar Almammed oghlu (Azerbaijani: Ələsgər Alməmməd oğlu), popularly known as Ashig Alasgar (Azerbaijani: Aşıq Ələsgər; March 22, 1821 — March 7, 1926), was an Azerbaijani mystic troubadour (Ashik) and poet of Azerbaijani folk songs.

== Early life ==
Ashig Alasgar was born in 1821 in the village of Azat, then known as Aghkilsa, in what was then the Nor Bayazet uezd of the Erivan Khanate. His father Almammad worked as a carpenter. At the same time, he was also known for his intelligence in literature. Almammad was fairly good at poetry genres such as Gerayly, Qoshma and Bayati. It was presumed that Almammad had a huge impact on Ashiq Alasgar.

Ashiq Alasgar grew up in a big and poor family with three brothers and two sisters. He was the eldest son of the family. Due to the financial difficulties in his family, Alasgar was obliged to work on the farm of a rich landowner, Karbalayi Gurban when he was 14. While working here, Alasgar fell in love with a 12 years old daughter of Karbalayi Gurban. But due to his social background, he was refused to have such a relationship with agha's daughter and after some time Alasgar was fired.

Ashig Alasgar spent his childhood in the village of Azat and was uneducated. But despite this, he was able to learn the ashiq art from the elderly ashigs in his village. From his childhood, Alasgar was a careful listener and he very passionately participated in most events in his village due to his strong memory and story-telling ability, he could manage to memorize almost all ashiq stories (dastans) of that time. He played saz using his left hand.

== Activities ==
Ashiq Alasgar is considered one of the great representatives of Azerbaijani folk poetry. His poetries in Gerayly, Qoshma, Mukhammas, Cighali Tecnis, Giphilbend genres have influenced ashigs' next-generation. Ashig Alasgar was almost a master in branches of ashig art and contributed a lot to Azerbaijani literature. Alasgar wrote his first poetries in his adolescence period. Shortly after, his father encouraged him to learn ashig art from one of the famous ashigs in Goycha district, Ashig Ali. After a long term preparation, Alasgar had a chance to participate in a wedding ceremony in his village with Ashig Ali. In that event, everyone appreciated the intelligence of Alasgar as he was able to defeat his instructor Ashiq Ali in a debate (kind of competition between two ashigs) and that event made Alasgar very famous in Sevan region and neighbouring districts. He actively participated in several wedding ceremonies and important events in Yerevan, Nakhchivan, Gazakh, Garabagh, Javanshir, Ganja, Kalbajar other regions.

== Later life ==
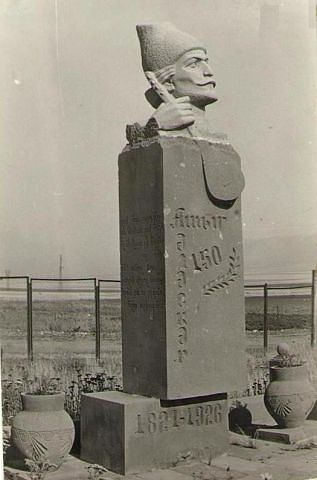
Grave of Ashig Alasgar in Azat

Due to heartbreak from his first love, Alasgar did not marry anyone until he was 40 and then he married a girl named Anakhanima from the village Yanshaq in Kalbajar district. In this period, Ashig Alasgar was busy with different activities in order to take care of his family. In spring and summertime, he was engaged in agriculture, small construction works and carpentry. But despite all of the above activities, he spent most of his time to the ashig art and wrote several poems. Alasgar was known not only in Azerbaijan but also as a master of ashig art in Turkey, Iran and Dagestan.

Alasgar completed his later life in misery and suffering. In 1915, he lost his brother's son and also his son-in-law at a very young age. After a year, his son Basir murdered the reeve of the village and escaped but instead, several people were arrested from Alasgar's family. During the period of 1918-1919 conflict between Azerbaijanis and Armenians, Alasgar was forced to leave his motherland and migrated to live in Kalbajar and then to Tartar districts. In 1921, he returned to Azat and continued to reside there for the rest of his life.

Ashig Alasgar died in Azat on March 7, 1926.

== See also ==
- Ashiq Najaf Dashkandli
