= Kaygusuz Abdal =

Folk poet (1341–1444)

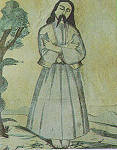
- Born: Alaattin Gaybi; 1341; Alaiye
- Died: 1444 (aged 102–103)
- Occupation: Folk poet

Kaygusuz Abdal (1341–1444) was a Turkish folk poet of the 14th century. In terms of religion, he was a dervish and completed his Islamic pilgrimage, afterwards visiting many populated areas across Western Asia and the Balkans.

== Background ==
In the 14th century, Alaiye was the capital of the small Alaiye beylik (principality). Kaygusuz Abdal was born in or near Alaiye (modern Alanya, Antalya Province of Turkey). His name was Alaattin Gaybi, and Kaygusuz Abdal was his pseudonym. According to tradition he was a bey's son (i.e., prince). But instead of politics, he chose to be a dervish. His tutor was Abdal Musa.

== Life ==
Details of his life and travels are ambiguous. Most of the stories attributed to him are not reliable. His works, however, convey that he travelled to many places. He travelled to Mecca for the Hajj. He also visited Damascus, Najaf and Karbala. There are unreliable accounts of his visits to cities in the Balkans like Yambol, Plovdiv (now both in Bulgaria), Bitola (now in the Republic of Macedonia) and Edirne (now in Turkey). In Egypt, he gained the title Abdullah Magaravi ("God's servant living in a cave") after spending several years in seclusion.

== Works ==
His poetic works include:

- Divan,
- Gülistan,
- Mesnevi-i Baba Kaygusuz (3 Vol.),
- Gevher-nâme,
- Minber-nâme.

His other works are:

- Budala-nâme,
- Kitab-ı Miglate,
- Vücûd nâme
- Saray-nâme
- Dilgüşâ.
