= Women in Palestine =

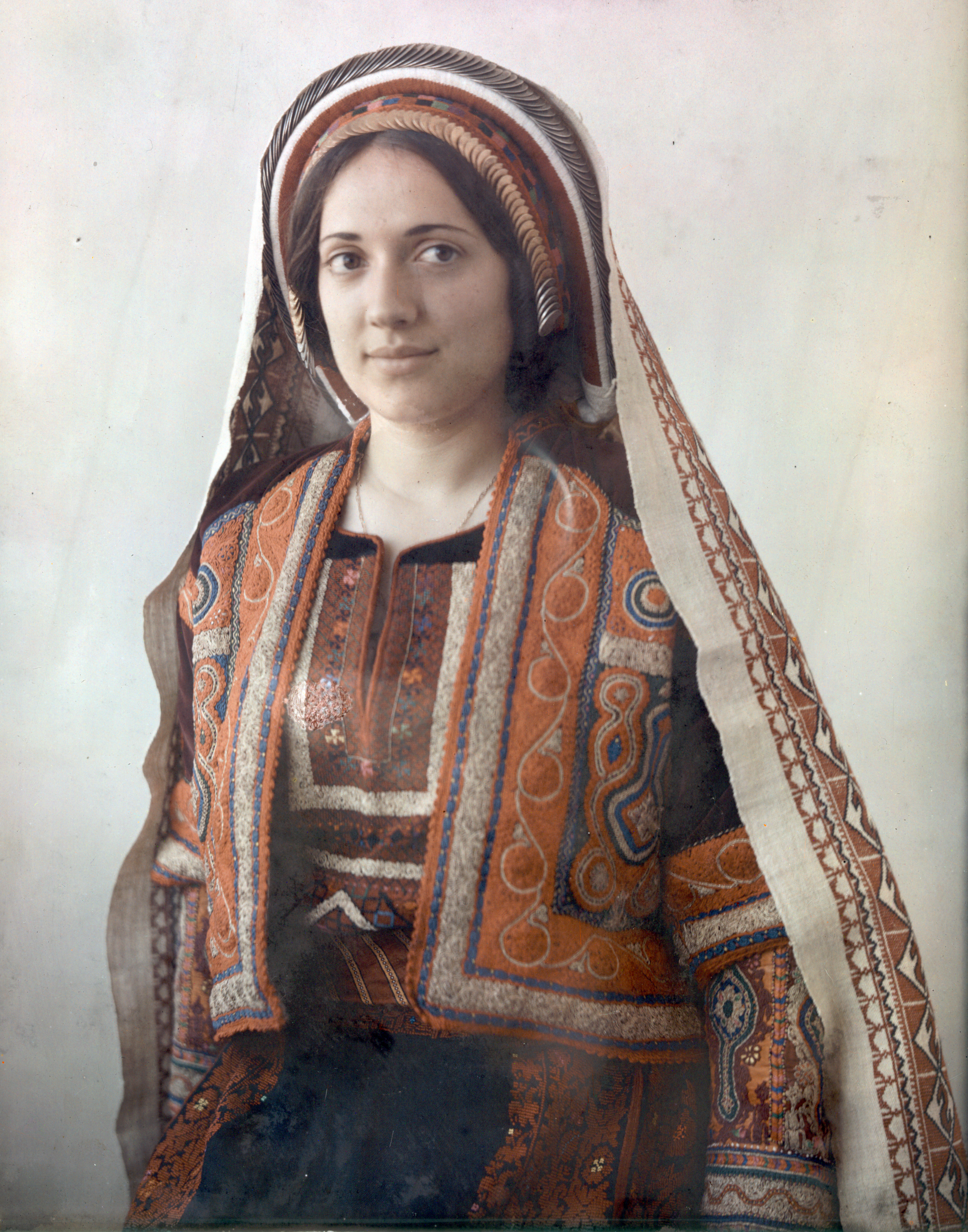
Portrait by the American Colony Photo Department of an Arab woman from Ramallah dressed in a traditional embroidered costume, taken sometime between 1929 and 1946.

Palestinian women have played an important role in the region throughout many historical changes including Ottoman control, the British Mandate, and Israeli control. Women were involved in the founding of the Palestine Liberation Organization in 1964 and the later establishment of the Palestinian Authority in 1994, working to shape and redefine the roles of women in Palestine and across the Palestinian diaspora. Arab women have been involved in resistance movements in Palestine, Jordan, Syria, and Lebanon throughout the 20th century and into the 21st century.

== History ==
=== Before 1881 ===
In broader societal terms, households in 19th-century Palestine were under significant pressure to maintain wealth and social standing, often requiring the consolidation of property and resources under a male lineage. Both legal and social norms reinforced the practice, which prioritized collective family interests over the individual rights of women. As Doumani notes, women were often married off strategically to cement alliances, and their inheritance rights were sometimes reduced to prevent the dispersal of family wealth. Women’s roles were further shaped by their relationships with their sons. According to Deniz Kandiyoti, women in these households relied on the loyalty of their sons, with maternal authority often linked to the ability to secure this loyalty and manage inherited property. Kandiyoti emphasizes that women’s control over property could enhance their status in the household, particularly in managing relations with other women such as daughters-in-law. However, these relationships were shaped by patriarchal norms that constrained women’s autonomy in property matters.

While the broader societal context restricted women’s full control over property, clothing was an area where they held significant ownership. These textiles, often among the most valuable items in a household, were carefully preserved, reflecting their role as long-term assets. In fact, clothing was frequently more valuable than furniture in inheritance records, highlighting its importance in maintaining family wealth. In addition to their economic function, clothing also conveyed social information, signifying wealth, status, identity, and regional origin. For women, these garments represented not only personal belongings but also a form of financial security. This control over clothing, however, was distinct from broader property ownership. It offered women a measure of economic agency, though still constrained by the expectations and structures that limited their influence over other forms of wealth within the family.

In addition to clothing, land inheritance followed similar patterns shaped by patriarchal norms and economic pressures. While Islamic law theoretically granted women inheritance rights, typically at half the share of a male heir, local customs often favored male lineage, with land passed down through sons and women inheriting only if no male heirs were present. However, by the mid-1800s, shifting economic conditions, such as land consolidation and the rise of a rural middle class, complicated these practices. With growing wealth, male relatives and neighbors increasingly sought to disinherit women, often undermining their legal rights. Yet, the expansion of urban legal systems, including Islamic courts, gave women an opportunity to challenge these practices and assert their rights. Many women in rural areas, particularly in places like Nablus, resorted to these courts in hopes of securing their inheritance. Despite this, many refrained from legal action, recognizing the risk of alienating crucial male relatives whose support was necessary for managing and profiting from inherited land. As a result, women’s decisions to pursue or abandon inheritance claims were deeply influenced by family dynamics, balancing the potential legal benefits with the social costs of challenging male relatives.

=== Opposing Jewish settlements in Ottoman Syria ===
There was a shift in Palestine's social order in 1884 when women first participated alongside men in protesting against the first Jewish settlements near the town of Afulah. Between 1900 and 1910, the region of Palestine (which included what is now Jordan) was under Ottoman rule, and Arab women initiated the creation of numerous associations and societies. These organizations were formed mostly in the larger cities, and especially in cities with large Christian populations such as Jaffa, Jerusalem, Haifa, and Acre.

In March 1920, twenty-nine women from northern Palestine wrote to the region’s chief administrator, voicing their concerns and understanding of the consequences of the Balfour Declaration. "We have read your declarations concerning the Jewish settlement in our country and making it their national home,” they stated. “As this right is detrimental to us in every way... we Moslem and Christian ladies who represent other ladies of Palestine protest vigorously against these declarations that cause the sub-division of our country."

Also in the 1920s, the policies of the British Mandate and Zionist immigration led to growing nationalist sentiments. National struggle mobilized educated middle and upper-class women to form the first Palestinian Women’s Union in Jerusalem in 1921. Large demonstrations demanding the repeal of the Balfour Declaration and limiting Zionist immigration to Palestine were organized and attended by women, who feared encroachment on Palestinian land.

On October 29, 1929, the first Women’s Conference was convened in Jerusalem with an audience of hundreds of women. Attendees would organize future programs, such as demonstrations, spreading leaflets, and sit-ins, all to protest British Mandatory policies.

During the 1936 to 1939 Arab revolt in Palestine, many Palestinians revolted against the British administration, calling for an end to British rule and the end of Jewish immigration. Women’s movements during this period coordinated with national movements to boycott foreign and Zionist products, organize protests against British and Zionist threats, smuggle arms past British Army checkpoints, and organize relief efforts for families of men who were imprisoned. Men were not allowed to move as freely as women, thus many women acted as couriers, collecting money to further fund the nationalist movement. Certain women were also trained in how to handle a rifle and at times, although rarely, women engaged in armed conflict against the British, leading some to be wounded or killed.

==== Arab Women's Association of Palestine ====
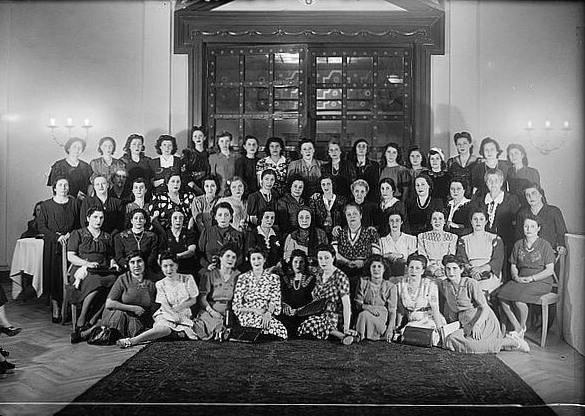
Arab Women's Association, Jerusalem, 1929

In 1929, Palestinian women created a society known as the Arab Women's Association of Palestine, which was based in Jerusalem. The society held demonstrations against the Palestinian Jewish settlements. Due to a lack of funding and social and political pressure that was put on the Association's members, the group ceased to exist after two years. Women formed a 'rescue committee' to collect donations in order to revive it.

=== 1929 Palestine riots ===
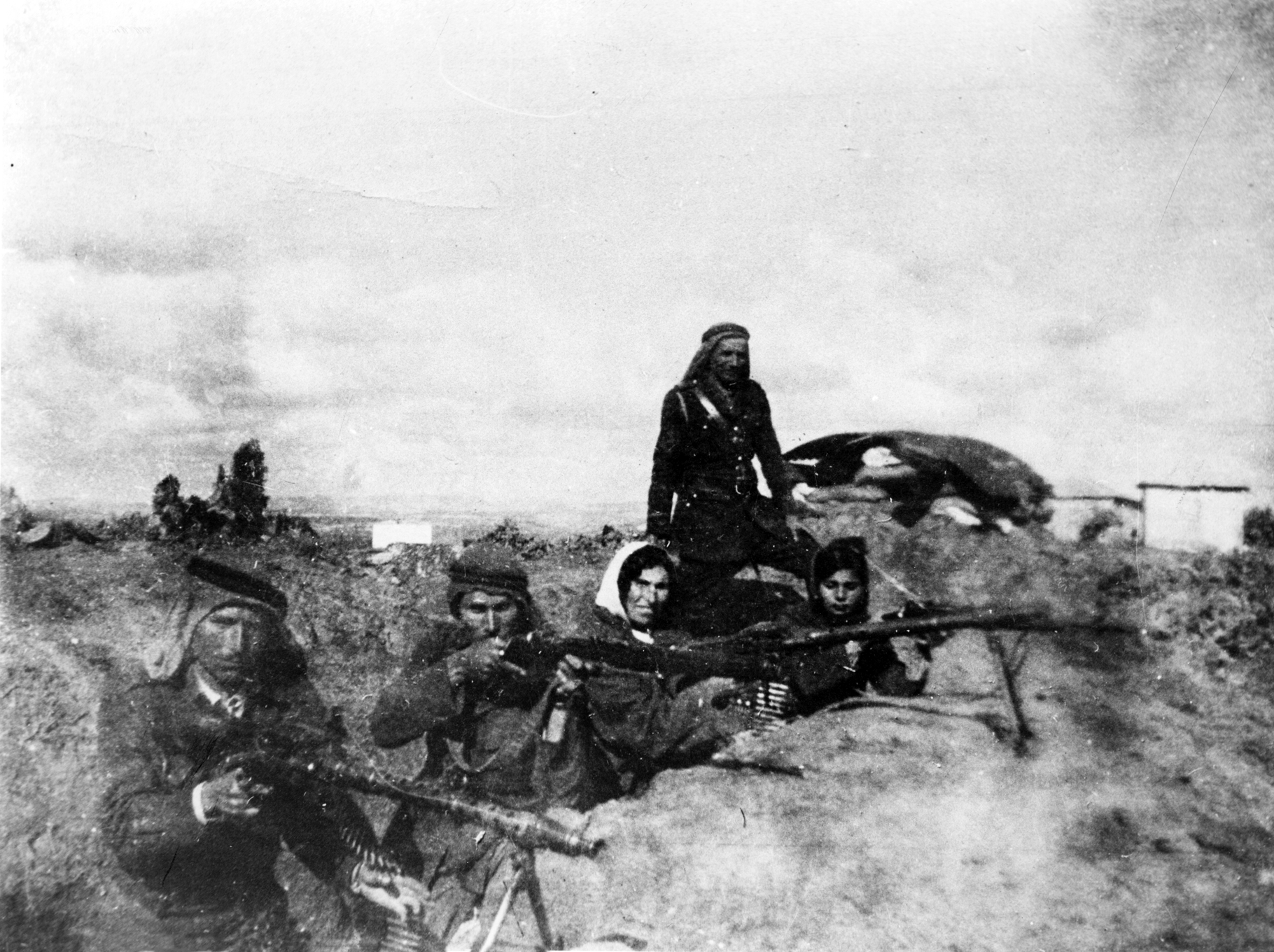
Male and female Palestinian fighters during the 1936 Arab revolt

In the 1929 Palestine riots, women participated in multiple protests and demonstrations, sometimes resulting in women being killed by the British Mandate forces. They organized a Women's Conference, where they sent a protest letter to King George V and the League of Nations.

=== Founding of the State of Israel ===
Following the creation of the state of Israel in 1948, Palestinian women faced many new obstacles. The displacement and loss of land for Palestinians created economic issues, which in turn created a demand for women in the workforce despite social restrictions at the time.

Following the establishment of the Palestine Liberation Organization (PLO) in 1964, women helped create the group known as the Palestinian Women’s Association, which allowed women to take part in the first session of the Palestinian National Council that was held in Jerusalem in 1964.

== Israeli–Palestinian conflict ==
The Israeli–Palestinian conflict has seriously affected Palestinian women. Since the beginning of the 20th century and subsequent Israeli-Palestinian Conflicts, Palestinian women have been closely linked to national self-determination; thus, the Palestinian women’s movement grew in tandem with Palestinian national movements. During these struggles for national self-determination, many women’s movements have taken (and continue to take) pragmatic steps towards demanding their rights, often choosing to override women’s liberation for support of nationalist causes. At a time in which participation mattered the most, they seized the opportunity to enhance their skills of organization, conduct military operations, and plan changes in family law to secure their status in a future state if they were to establish one successfully.

=== Women and anti-Israel movements ===
In the aftermath of the 1948 Arab-Israeli War, many Palestinians were expelled from their homes leading many to find refuge in other nations such as Jordan, Syria, and Lebanon. Following the Nakba, many women were concerned about their own survival, which led to a decline in women’s public activity. The Nakba forced the women’s movement, which continued in the 50s and 60s, to expand its outreach to support families in desperation. The Palestinian Women’s Union established orphanages, health clinics, and first-aid centers in the West Bank. Politically, many joined political organizations such as the Jordanian Communist Party, the Arab Nationalist Movement, and other underground political parties during this period of exile. The women who occupied these political movements were generally those of the middle class, as limitations from socio-economic pressures hampered their ability to branch out their movements to poorer neighborhoods and refugee camps. Nevertheless, the role of women in these parties was oftentimes limited as very few attained leadership roles, and many were pushed into social service sectors; the aspect of women’s liberation was given little attention in these movements.

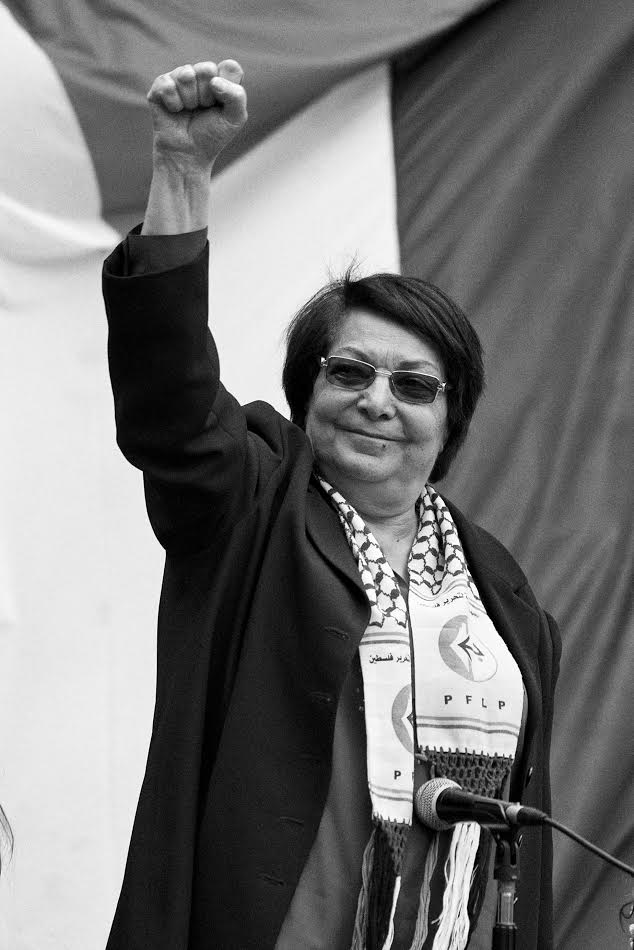
Political activist, Leila Khaled, raising a fist with the Palestinian flag in the background, 2017

Following the Six-Day War in 1967, Israel gained control of the West Bank and the Gaza Strip. During this occupation of once-Palestinian land, Israel implemented structural changes that changed the socio-economic lives of the population, resulting in Palestine’s economy depending heavily on Israel’s economy. The women of Palestine now faced a triple form of oppression through class, gender, and nationality. Amid escalating tensions, women like Leila Khaled became involved in the Palestinian Resistance Movement (PRM), participating in military and political activities. The PRM still implemented a strict division of labor between men and women and between the young and old. Women were sometimes assigned to duties such as providing food and uniforms for soldiers, although younger members were sent to camps to be trained in armed struggle while older women filled administrative roles. Elsewhere, another movement emerged, one different from the strategies of previous organizations, one that sought to effectively mobilize those from universities, villages, and refugee camps. Announced in 1978 on International Women’s Day, the Women's Work Committee came to represent an association willing to develop a strategy to combine national liberation and women's liberation. The founders of the committee were disappointed in the actions of previous charitable societies as they had failed to educate the general population; to rectify this issue, they launched programs promoting literacy, health education, as well as classes teaching embroidery. Further aiding those of a working-class background, they started daycare centers to allow them to continue working as their children were being cared for.

In the early 1980s, the Women’s Work Committee would split into four separate committees as a result of differing political agendas and ideologies. The largest of these organizations was the Federation of Palestinian Women’s Action Committees (FPWAC) which aligned itself with the Democratic Front for the Liberation of Palestine (DFLP). The Union of Palestinian Working Women’s Committee (UPWWC) supported the Palestinian Communist Party, and the remaining organizations were the Union of Palestinian Women’s Committees (UPWC) and the Women’s Committee for Social Work (WCSW). Due to opposing views and strategies on organizing, each organization attracted different members of society; for example, the UPWWC organized mainly working women while the UPWC concentrated on more educated middle-class members, and the WCSW was more alike to the charitable societies that provided services to women rather than mobilizing them politically.

In the midst of the First Intifada, all four of the Women’s committees began to mobilize their members to sustain the Intifada, calling for their liberation if they were to implement a free Palestinian state successfully. The daycare centers were opened longer to allow mothers to participate in the uprising and health education began to offer classes on first aid to use on the victims of the Israeli army. These committees would take up the call of the Unified National Leadership of the Uprising (UNLU) to entice those unwilling to participate in the demonstrations. Organizing marches, promoting boycotts, and confronting soldiers allowed women of all ages to participate, leading some to become victims, either imprisoned or killed by shots from Israeli troops, gas inhalation, or beatings. During the 1988 International Women’s Day march, slogans calling for both an independent state and women’s liberation were used simultaneously. On the same day, a joint effort by all four of the committees participated in a program calling women to join popular committees, trade unions, boycotts, and encouraging a ‘home economy’ built off locally produced food and clothing. Although serving a role in the uprising, the call for women’s liberation was sidelined for the national movement as the UNLU would exclude women from participating in demonstrations and retained an attitude that was viewed as conservative and condescending.

=== Sexual violence during the Gaza War ===
On 19 February 2024, a group of United Nations special rapporteurs released a report stating "rights experts call for probe into violations against Palestinian women and girls." According to the report, there is evidence that during the Gaza war, Palestinian women and girls were subjected to wartime sexual violence. According to these reports, Palestinian women and girls were also subjected to inhuman and degrading treatment by the IDF, such as they were denied menstruation pads, food and medicine, and were severely beaten, raped, assaulted, threatened with rape and sexual violence, and subjected to multiple forms of sexual assaults. Palestinian women and girls were also stripped naked and searched by male Israeli army officers. OHCHR denounced that Israeli troops had photographed female detainees in “degrading circumstances” and that the photos had been uploaded online.

The UN report states, "Palestinian women and girls in detention have also been subjected to multiple forms of sexual assault, such as being stripped naked and searched by male Israeli army officers. At least two female Palestinian detainees were reportedly raped". One of the special rapporteurs; Reem Alsalem, cautioned that the reservation in reporting sexual violence was common due to reprisal concerns. Alsalem stated that since the 7 October attacks, women and girls in Israeli detention had faced an increasingly permissive attitude by Israeli officials towards sexual assault. According to Middle East Eye, the phrase "at least" highlighted the fact that many occurrences remain unrecorded, as victims dread the stigma and repercussions associated with speaking out about sexual abuse in "a patriarchal society reluctant to address such atrocities".

The special rapporteurs have also raised concerns over a number of Palestinian women and children going missing, with reports of children being separated from their parents. In one instance a female infant was reportedly forcibly moved to Israel by the IDF. In response to the report, a spokesman for the U.S. Department of State said, "Civilians and detainees must be treated humanely, and in accordance with international humanitarian law." Physicians for Human Rights–Israel also described the sexual humiliation of detainees, including sexual insults and urination on prisoners.

The Associated Press in March 2024 reported on Palestinian women giving testimony about having been abused during their detention by Israel, one woman said that Israeli soldiers conducted strip searches, and during the detention, if "we raised our heads or uttered any words, they beat us on the head [...] Loud music, shouting and intimidation — they wanted to humiliate us. We were handcuffed, blindfolded, and our feet were tied in chains"; another woman alleged that an Israeli soldier smashed her face into a wall when she would not kiss the flag of Israel.

A detailed and legally mandated June 2024 investigative report by the Independent International Commission of Inquiry on the Occupied Palestinian Territory stated both Israel and Hamas had committed sexual violence and torture, along with intentional attacks on civilians. Regarding Israeli actions against Palestinians, the report concludes that sexual and gender-based violence (SGBV) is deployed by Israeli forces and civilians against Palestinian women and men, throughout the occupied Palestinian territories. The report concludes that: "The frequency, prevalence and severity of sexual and gender-based crimes perpetrated against Palestinians since 7 October across the Occupied Palestinian Territories (OPT) indicate that specific forms of Sexual and gender-based violence (SGBV) are part of Israeli Security Forces (ISF) operating procedures."

The Commission's report was completed through the use of interviewing victims and witnesses along with a variety of other means, and Israel had previously announced its refusal to cooperate. The report indicates that sexual violence was used by the IDF to push the idea of "the subordination of an occupied people" in both Gaza and the Israeli-occupied West Bank.

In December 2024, dozens of Palestinian women and girls reported that sexual abuse were committed against them by Israeli forces during the storming of the Kamal Adwan hospital. They described being forced to undress, strip-searched and sexually harassed. Those who attempted to resist were "brutally beaten". One witness stated "They told us they would film us to show [the world] that Hamas was using us as human shields. When we arrived, they dragged us by our hair across the schoolyard, forced us into toilets, and ordered us to undress".

In March 2025, a report by the Independent International Commission of Inquiry on the Occupied Palestinian Territory, including East Jerusalem, and Israel, submitted to the Human Rights Council, detailed the systematic use of sexual and gender-based violence by Israeli Security Forces since October 2023. The report documented multiple instances of Israeli soldiers attempting to humiliate Palestinian women by wearing or posing with their underwear and sharing the images online, while referring to them as "prostitutes" and "sluts." The Commission also detailed instances of sexual violence directed against Palestinian girls. Female prisoners were forced to pose in degrading circumstances, including in their underwear and in front of an Israeli flag, with the photos also circulated online. They were subjected to sexual assault, harassment, forced nudity, and threats of rape.

== Women's rights in Palestine ==
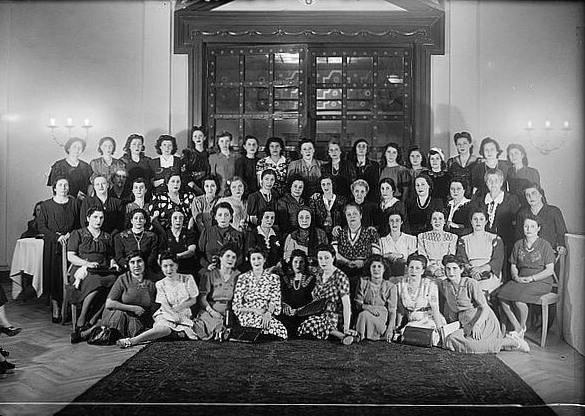
Arab Women's Association, Jerusalem, (fr), 1929

=== History and geographic variation ===
Women’s rights in Palestine have changed numerous times over the course of recent Palestinian history. Many of the laws enacted during Ottoman control, the British Mandate, Egyptian and Jordanian control, as well as Israeli occupation, have continued to be maintained throughout the 20th century and into the 21st century. In 1967, Israel occupied Palestinian territories in the Gaza Strip and the West Bank. The Oslo Agreement in 1995 established further divisions within Palestinian territory: the West Bank was divided into Area A, Area B, and Area C which makes up 60% of the West Bank. The Palestinian Authority (PA) maintains the administrative duties and internal security of Area A; Area B is under the jurisdiction of both the PA and Israel; and Area C is fully under Israeli military and gubernatorial control. The West Bank continues to feel the effects of the Jordanian Penal Code of 1960 on its legal system. Whereas, the legal system of the Gaza Strip is still impacted by penal codes set during the British Mandate as well as Egyptian control, today the territory is governed by the Palestinian militant group Hamas. The legal system in Palestine is not uniform across all territories, meaning that women's rights are subjected to different codes of law depending on where they are in Palestine. Issues reported by women in the Occupied Palestinian territory are: gender based-discrimination, violence which includes child marriage, intimate violence, sexual harassment, rape, denial of medical and legal resources, psychological abuse and risk of sexual exploitation and abuse. Factors accounting for the risk have included decades of Israeli occupation and conflict-related violence, and prevailing traditional patriarchal cultural norms in Palestinian society.

=== Laws on family matters ===
Divorce rights for women depend on the personal status laws that apply to Muslims, which state that a man can divorce his wife for any reason, while women can request divorce only under certain circumstances. If a woman proceeds to a divorce she does not need to present any evidence, but would give up any financial rights and must return her dowry. The Ministry of Women's Affairs in Palestine, established in 2003, is the main governmental agency responsible for promoting and protecting women's rights. Government ministries promote reform of discriminatory laws and gender units have been established in each ministry. When a woman gets a divorce, she has custody of her children up until they are a certain age, depending on whether they live in the Gaza Strip or the West Bank. Ottoman-era laws on shared marital property continue to restrict the division of belongings between partners after divorce. In November 2019, a Presidential Decree raised the minimum marriage age to 18 years old for both the West Bank and the Gaza Strip, though exceptions could be made by Sharia courts for Palestinian Muslims; this exception could also be applied to Palestinian Christians. Practices relating to family matters differ based on different religious traditions in Islam and the varying sects of Christianity that are present in Palestine.

=== Rape and abortion laws ===
Up until the 2000s, there had been laws in both the West Bank and the Gaza Strip allowing rapists to escape punishment by marrying their rape victims. In the West Bank, this law had been maintained by the Jordanian Penal Code of 1960, whereas in the Gaza Strip a similar standard had been kept up by the British Penal Code of 1936 and during Egyptian control of the territory. While rape is criminalized in both penal codes, the ability to escape punishment or mitigating conditions with "honor" killings created insecurity for rape victims in the West Bank and Gaza. In 2018, the Jordanian Penal Code of 1960 – which upheld this standard in the West Bank – was officially repealed. The penal code in the Gaza Strip had been repealed by the Egyptian People's Assembly in 1999.

According to Article 8 of Palestinian Public Health Law No. 20 (passed in 2004), abortion is legal only to save the life of the pregnant woman. Anecdotal reports suggest that prosecutions are rare. Abortion access in the occupied Palestinian territories is greatly impacted by Israel's military occupation and the resulting travel restrictions and conflicting legal systems.

In Israel, abortion is permitted when determined by a termination committee. Palestinians living in East Jerusalem have access to Israeli hospitals. Palestinians living in the West Bank and Gaza have obtained abortions in Israel, but the number appears to have been very small in the 2010s.

Some doctors in the West Bank are willing to perform illegal abortions. The Palestinian Family Planning and Protection Association, which provides referrals to such doctors, provided abortion-related services to more than 10,000 women in 2014.

=== The Labor Law of 2000 ===
The Palestinian Labor Law of 2000 was enacted in an attempt to create some uniformity of legal precedents for labor laws across the various jurisdictions of Palestinian territories. The law reformed the previous labor regulations put in place during Jordanian and Egyptian control (of the West Bank and Gaza Strip respectively) for men and women, thus creating a more equal work environment. This labor law states that Palestinians have the right to work if they are capable of doing so and should not be discriminated against in the process. The Labor Law provides women with maternity leave before and after pregnancy; it prohibits gender-based discrimination, though it does not explicitly address gender-based violence in the workplace.

== Progress towards the empowerment of women ==
=== Education ===
==== Under the Ottoman Empire ====
Under the Ottoman Empire (1516-1917)[1], there were not enough resources invested in schooling. There were a few public and private schools located in the most populated regions which influenced the high illiteracy rate across all genders but especially for women. In the mid-19th century, Christian missionaries began to come to Palestine in attempts to transform and convert Palestinian communities who they referred to as “backwards” and “heathens”. Due to fears of Western imperialism and foreign Christian education, the Ottoman government began to emphasize state-sponsored education. In 1864, the Ottoman government created a policy that would only allow missionaries to create schools in communities with large Christian populations in order to prevent the expansion of Western imperialism within the Ottoman Empire. Under the reign of SultanʿAbdul Hamid II, the Law of Public Education of 1869 was implemented ten years after its creation. Under this law, elementary education was mandatory for all children under the age of 12. This piece of legislation also acknowledged the need for the education of girls as well as their education beyond the primary level; this resulted in the development of co-educational education as well as gender-segregated schooling in the regions that had the finances to maintain both schools. However, the promises made by the 1869 law never came to fruition as many girls were at most able to acquire intermediate-level education due to the lack of resources.

With the introduction of the press in Palestine in 1908, journalists and theorists began to openly criticize the quality of education under Christian missionaries. In 1911, the literary journal al-Nafaʾis al-ʿasriyya, a ghostwriter under the initials Kh. S, wrote an article about women’s education in Greater Syria, the region which included Palestine. In the format of a dialogue between a woman and her servant, the article discusses the lack of nationalist and home management education for young girls. Through the eyes of Arab Nationalists, without nationalist education in combination with training to be mothers and wives, women would not only be unable to care for their families but they would also produce generations of Arabs who did not know the Arabic language or values. Many schools in the Ottoman Empire, under the guise of being state-run, gave missionaries and Western organizations like the American Colony the authority to administer schools.

==== Under British Mandate ====
During World War I (1914–1918), the Ottoman government faced economic, political and social hardship which resulted in the further deterioration of their schools. The casualties due to military service in WWI in combination with the famine caused by the British blockade of the Syrian coast, hundreds of thousands lost, leaving women and children to protect and defend themselves. Following the war, the Ottoman Empire conceded the territory of Palestine in 1918, and following the San Remo Conference, the United Kingdom was given the mandate to provide “administrative advice and assistance” until Palestine could govern itself (Article XXII of Covenant of the League of Nations). The British colonial administration witnessed this chaotic time and invested in education, understanding that education could protect girls from the effects of the war.

The first Director of Education, Humphrey Bowman (1920–1936) expressed the need for education in order to “train up good citizens of the country.” However, this intent to support the education of children, specifically girls, was neglected and communities across Palestine did not receive the resources needed. As regions had to deal with overcrowded and understaffed schools, the British enforced standards that only worsened the conditions. Regions like the district of Hebron which only had one school to support 70,000 residents (resulting in 77% of student applications being turned away), were forced to build a new girls' school without the financial assistance of the British. Due to the lack of funding, schools, especially ones for girls, were never expanded or in some cases, never built. In rural villages, girls had even less access to education, generally for financial reasons, such as the mandatory construction of separate schools for boys and girls, as well as agricultural ones. The British were concerned that with too much education, there would be a crisis as it would "leave the fields untilled or…lessen the fitness or disposition of the people for agricultural employment" in the words of Lord Cromer, the British Consul General to Egypt.

In 1920, the High Commissioner for Palestine, Herbert Samuel, approved the construction of 300 rural elementary schools for both girls and boys in four years, but by 1925, only 98 new buildings had been constructed and only 10 were for girls. Additionally, A. L. Tibawi states that the British administration reduced their educational budget from £130,000 in 1921 to £97,279 in 1923–1924, while simultaneously increasing their state revenue by over a million pounds over ten years (1921–1931). By the end of the Mandate period (1948), the government only administered 80 girls' schools in all of Palestine with 15,303 students, and Arab girls made up only 21% of all the students in government schools. Only about 7.5 percent of girls in rural areas received an education in comparison to 60% of girls in urban regions.

==== Post-creation of Israel ====
Following World War II, the United Nations divided Palestinian land into different sections. In 1948, mandatory Palestine was terminated and the Israeli state was created. Palestinian territory was divided among Israel, Jordan, and Egypt. Although Israel later gained control of some Palestinian territory following The 1948 Arab-Israeli War, the people on this land did not have access to Israeli educational systems. The regions of East Jerusalem, the West Bank, and the Gaza Strip were required to follow Jordanian and Egyptian curriculum. Even after the annexation of the West Bank by Israel in 1967, Palestinians in the regions continued to follow Jordanian curricula due to the Israeli military control over Palestine. Following the signing of the Oslo Accord in 1993, Palestinians were able to create their own textbooks outside of Jordanian guidelines. From 1994 to 2000, the Palestinian authority was given the opportunity to establish its own textbooks under the supervision of the Jordanian Ministry of Education.

In 2008, UNESCO included Palestinian hikaye, a form of women's oral literature, on its list of intangible cultural heritage, thereby recognizing its cultural significance.

According to a 2018 study, in the 2017-2018 academic year of the 48 licensed and accredited higher education institutions in Palestine, women made up about 60% of the student population and 23% of the academic faculty. However, these statistics do not share the full experiences of students in Palestine. The Palestinian Monitoring Group has stated that Israeli military and settler activity in the Occupied Palestinian Territories (OPT) affected 28% of the Palestinian student population through killings, injuries and arrests. Additionally, the curfew imposed by the Israeli army caused the loss of more than 1,500 school days for students between 2003 and 2005.

==== Impact of education ====
Since the mid-1970s, families have been moving towards highly educating their daughters and enrolling them in universities rather than just getting a high school diploma. The reason for this change is that women are becoming needed in the labor market, changing the economic situation in the West Bank. The idea that an educated young woman is desirable for marriage is firmly established.

== Feminist movements in Palestine today ==
=== Tal‘at Movement ===
Tal‘at – launched under the slogan "No Free Homeland without Free Women" – is a Palestinian feminist movement that seeks to redefine liberation by intertwining the fight against gender-based violence with the broader Palestinian struggle for national emancipation. Launched in 2019 in response to the killing of 21-year-old Israa Ghrayeb, whose family were charged with murder for committing a suspected "honor killing", Tal‘at emerged as a call to action against domestic violence and patriarchy within Palestinian society. Ghrayeb's death, which sparked widespread outrage, led to protests organized by Tal‘at in cities including Ramallah, Haifa, Gaza, Bethlehem, Nazareth, and Beirut. These demonstrations demanded justice for Israa, accountability for perpetrators, and systemic legal reforms to protect women from gender-based violence. This initial wave of protests cemented Tal‘at as a movement uniting women across geographic and political divides, blending feminist and nationalist struggles.

One of Tal‘at's defining moments came during the 2021 Nakba Day protest in Haifa, held amidst Operation "Guardian of the Walls." Despite facing intense police violence, right-wing counter-protests, and threats of suppression, Tal‘at mobilized its network to ensure the protest occurred, with women comprising 80% of the participants.

The movement focuses on addressing the fragmentation of Palestinian communities across territories and authorities, as noted by its proponents. By calling for a unified fight against both patriarchal violence and occupation, Tal‘at fosters solidarity among Palestinian women in Gaza, the West Bank, and the '48 territories. Supporters claim that, unlike earlier feminist movements, Tal‘at integrates feminist ideals to gain broader recognition for its objectives.

=== Women's rights organizations ===
There are multiple organizations working in Palestinian territories today to help reform the legal system and protect women's rights.

- The Aisha Association for Women and Child Protection provides mental health support for Palestinian women and girls impacted by the Israeli–Palestinian conflict.
- Amnesty International monitors, investigates, and reports human rights abuses by governments (the PA and Hamas, in the case of the Palestinian Territories) and those that result from international conflict. Their April 2024 report includes a section on Women's and Girl's Rights.
- UN Women conducts research on the Palestinian legal system and works to ensure gender equality within Palestinian territories.
- The Women's Center for Legal Aid and Counseling (WCLAC) works to reform personal status laws and support Palestinian women who face domestic violence as well as violence from Israeli forces.
- The Women's Peace and Humanitarian Fund is a UN-affiliated channel for financial support for local women's organizations, particularly women's participation in conflict resolution, and women's economic development.

== See also ==
- Palestine women's national football team
- General Union of Palestinian Women
- Palestinian traditional costumes
- Islamic marital practices
