= Abortion in Palestine =

According to Article 8 of Palestinian Public Health Law No. 20 (passed in 2004), abortion is legal only to save the life of the pregnant woman. Anecdotal reports suggest that prosecutions are rare. In 2016 the Palestinian Ministry of Health told Reuters that abortion was also allowed in cases of foetal impairment, if both parents consent. Abortion access in Palestine is greatly impacted by Israel's military occupation and the resulting travel restrictions and conflicting legal systems. Estimates based on limited data suggest that 15% of pregnancies in Palestine end in abortion, and one third of these abortions are unsafe (self-induced or performed by an untrained provider).

Some doctors in the West Bank are willing to perform illegal abortions. The Palestinian Family Planning and Protection Association, which provides referrals to such doctors, provided abortion-related services to more than 10,000 women in 2014. Misoprostol (Cytotec), which can be used to induce abortion, is widely available at pharmacies in the West Bank, according to a 2016 study. Stories of women trying to end their own pregnancies in dangerous ways (jumping from tall heights, inserting sharp objects into their bodies) are common and sometimes result in deaths.

In Israel, abortion is permitted when determined by a termination committee. Palestinians living in East Jerusalem have access to Israeli hospitals. Palestinians living in the West Bank and Gaza have obtained abortions in Israel, but the number appears to have been very small in the 2010s. Before the Second Intifada, many women living in the West Bank did travel to Jerusalem to receive abortion care.
