= Ahmed Abu Hasira =

Ahmed Abu Hasira, also known as Myuz, is a Palestinian breakdancer, coach, filmmaker and content creator from Gaza. He has been involved in breakdance in Gaza, founding a breakdance academy and later a center offering activities for children.

== Career ==
Myuz became involved in breakdance in Gaza and worked as a trainer and coach. In 2020, Reuters photographed him performing breakdance in Gaza City during the restrictions associated with the COVID-19 pandemic. His photographs were later published by international media outlets, including The Guardian, The National and The Week.

In 2020 an article in Raseef22 reported that Myuz had established a parkour academy in Gaza and that the Myuz Gaza team had become the academy's official team. The article described his efforts to train children and develop breakdance in Gaza despite restrictions on freedom of movement and difficulties in traveling outside the territory for training and workshops.

Myuz was also the founder of with GB Crew, a collective of Palestinian breakdancers and parkour practitioners. The collective contributed footage to a contemporary dance production in Phoenix, Arizona, choreographed by French artist Eric Minh Cuong Castaing. The production featured video footage of the collective performing acrobatic parkour in urban areas of Gaza

== Work with children ==
Abu Hasira has worked with children through sports, dance, and creative activities. The HOPE Foundation, which has supported cultural and artistic programs in Gaza, reported that it supported Myuz in establishing the first breakdance academy in Gaza.

The academy was later renamed to Myuz Center for Psychological Support, according to the foundation's 2025 annual report. The report states that the center focused on children in need of protection and support.

== See also ==
- Parkour
- Breakdancing
- Gaza Strip
- Palestinian culture
