= List of Intangible Cultural Heritage elements in Palestine =

Location of Palestine

The United Nations Educational, Scientific and Cultural Organization (UNESCO) defines intangible cultural heritage (Arabic: التراث الثقافي غير المادي) elements as non-physical traditions and practices performed by a people. As part of a country's cultural heritage, they include celebrations, festivals, performances, oral traditions, music, and the making of handicrafts. The term intangible cultural heritage is formally established by the Convention for the Safeguarding of the Intangible Cultural Heritage, which was drafted in 2003 and took effect in 2006. The inscription of new heritage elements on UNESCO's Intangible Cultural Heritage Lists for protection and safeguarding is determined by the Intergovernmental Committee for the Safeguarding of Intangible Cultural Heritage, an organization established by the Convention. Palestine ratified the Convention on 8 December 2011. It has served on the Intangible Cultural Heritage Committee from 2016 to 2020.

Starting in 2008, Palestinian hikaye was the first practice from Palestine to be inscribed by UNESCO; Palestinian embroidery was inscribed in 2021. Joint inscriptions with other Arab countries for Arabic calligraphy and date palm cultivation and use were inscribed in 2021 and 2022 respectively. Four further practices have been nominated for inscription by Palestine: dabkeh in 2023 and Nabulsi soap-making in 2024; metal engraving, and henna, with other Arab states, in 2023 and 2024 respectively. In 2025, Arabic Kohl was inscribed in a transnational nomination. Palestine also maintains a national list, the National Register of Elements of the Intangible Cultural Heritage of Palestine, which consisted of 18 items in 2017. National lists are required by the Convention for the further nomination of elements to the UNESCO lists.

As of February 2026, Palestine has two nominations for the Representative List: Oud instrument: practices, skills and performing arts (which is transnational) (Note: Shared with Algeria, Bahrain, Egypt, Iraq, Jordan, Kuwait, Mauritania, Morocco, Oman, Qatar, Saudi Arabia, Sudan, Tunisia, the United Arab Emirates, and Yemen) and Ka'ak Al-Quds, Jerusalem sesame bread. They are scheduled to be reviewed by the committee, during the twenty-first session in November or December 2026. In the same session, Henna, rituals, aesthetic and social practices may also be extended to include India as a state party. In addition, Palestine has three elements, all transnational, that are "pending priority '0' treatment", meaning that they will be reviewed as soon as possible, after the current round of nominations. These are the Arabian horses: breeding traditions and associated arts, (Note: Shared with Bahrain, Egypt, Iraq, Jordan, Kuwait, Libya, Mauritania, Morocco, Oman, Qatar, Saudi Arabia, Sudan, Syria, Tunisia, and the United Arab Emirates.) Al sanbouk sailing boat: the craft and social traditions, (Note: Shared with Qatar, Bahrain, Egypt, Iraq, Kuwait, Libya, Mauritania, Oman, Saudi Arabia, Sudan, Tunisia, the United Arab Emirates, and Yemen) and The Nabati Arabic poetry: an oral expressive art; (Note: Shared with Saudi Arabia, Bahrain, Egypt, Iraq, Jordan, Kuwait, Libya, Mauritania, Qatar, Sudan, Syria, the United Arab Emirates, and Yemen) all of which are nominated for inscription on the Representative List. Art et traditions de bâtir en terre lit. 'Art and traditions of building with earth' was scheduled to be priority (ii), as a transnational nomination, (Note: Shared with Morocco, Saudi Arabia, Egypt, Mauritania, Tunisia, Iraq, Oman, Yemen, Jordan, the United Arab Emirates, and Sudan.) but the nomination was technically incomplete and thus returned.

== Background ==
In 1993, in response to the Oslo Agreement, significant investment was made in the protection of Palestinian cultural heritage. Its subsequent inscription to the UNESCO lists has given international recognition to these practices. Nonetheless, researchers have argued that the intangible cultural heritage of Palestine has struggled to survive under Israeli occupation. This is particularly evident in the construction of internal borders prohibiting access to land, with the resultant effect of hindering traditional agricultural practices and the semi-nomadic way of life of some communities. Systemic cultural appropriation of Palestine's heritage has also been reported, such as the use of traditional Palestinian embroidery in Israeli fashion.

In some cases, Palestinian heritage has been destroyed by the occupying forces. For example, in the South Hebron Hills, Palestinian cave houses were confiscated by Israeli forces and the residents evicted. This disconnected young people in the area from their heritage; to reconnect to their identity they collected oral histories on the cave-based lifestyle. Support for intangible cultural heritage has also been proposed as a way to foster economic and environmental sustainability, for example in the village of Battir. For many Palestinians, continued connection with their cultural heritage serves as a form of resistance. Palestinian henna designs have had a resurgence in popularity, according to TRT World writing in 2023, with a focus on olive designs, amongst others, as an act of resistance for women.

Other forms of intangible cultural heritage which are not inscribed, or nominated for inscription, include coffee preparation, Maqluba, Palestinian architecture, Nabulsi cheese, oral testimony from the South Hebron Hills, traditional song, as well as food practices of dried yoghurt and grape syrup. On-going nominations of intangible cultural heritage include Ka'ak Al-Quds (Jerusalem sesame bread), Art and traditions of building with earth, and Oud instrument: practices, skills and performing arts, all scheduled for inscription in 2026. The traditional ecological knowledge (TEK) of wild plant usage in Artas has been considered as another form of Palestinian intangible cultural heritage.

== Intangible Cultural Heritage of Humanity ==
UNESCO's Intangible Cultural Heritage of Humanity consists of three lists: the Representative List of the Intangible Cultural Heritage of Humanity, the List of Intangible Cultural Heritage in Need of Urgent Safeguarding, and the Register of Good Safeguarding Practices. Palestine only has elements inscribed on the Representative List.

† Transnational element

=== Representative List ===
This list aims to represent the intangible cultural heritage of Palestine worldwide and bring awareness to its significance.

Intangible Cultural Heritage elements recognized by UNESCO
Name	Media	Year	No.	Description
Palestinian hikaye		2008	00124	The Palestinian hikaye is a traditional narrative technique which is practiced by Palestinian women over the age of 70; it has been evolving for centuries. Common themes include family issues, concerns with Middle Eastern society, social structures affecting Palestinian women, and critique of society. It is practiced at home, during events or winter evenings. Women and children attend, but it is considered inappropriate for men to attend. The use of the Palestinian dialect, and good story-telling techniques including expressive language, emphasis, speech rhythms and vocal inflections are defining features of the Palestinian hikaye.
Arabic calligraphy: knowledge, skills and practices † (Note: Shared with Algeria, Bahrain, Egypt, Iraq, Jordan, Kuwait, Lebanon, Mauritania, Morocco, Oman, Saudi Arabia, Sudan, Tunisia, United Arab Emirates, and Yemen.)	Palestinian calligraphy on a ceramic tile	2021	01718	Arabic calligraphy is the practice of transforming and stretching the letters of the Arabic alphabet to convey numerous motifs. It was originally developed to make writing easily understandable and gradually came to be included in marble and wood carving, embroidery, and metal etching, among other art forms. Traditionally the writing instrument, known as the Qalam, is made from bamboo stems and reeds. The ink is created using honey, black soot, and saffron. The handmade paper is treated with starch, egg white and alum. More modern forms use markers, synthetic paint, and spray paint. It is passed down both informally and formally, through schools and apprenticeships.
The art of embroidery in Palestine, practices, skills, knowledge and rituals	A woman from Ramallah around the 1930s	2021	01722	Although traditional embroidery is widespread across Palestine and the Palestinian diaspora, it originated from rural areas. The choice of embroidery, including color and designs, signify the wearer's identity, including marital and socioeconomic status and regional identity. Women's clothing in Palestinian villages comprise a loose-fitting long dress, trousers, a jacket, a headdress and a veil. The dress—often called a thob—is embroidered with silk threads on wool, linen, and cotton. Embroidery is also a social activity, with women gathering, often with their daughters, to sew.
Date palm, knowledge, skills, traditions and practices † (Note: Shared with Bahrain, Egypt, Iraq, Jordan, Kuwait, Mauritania, Morocco, Oman, Qatar, Saudi Arabia, Sudan, Tunisia, United Arab Emirates, and Yemen.)	Date harvesting using black bags in Jericho	2022	01902	Many historically significant cultural practices associated with the Date palm have been fostered in the Arab world due to the date's sustenance. These range from the cultivation and care of date palms, to the use of it in social customs, and cultural references in song and poetry. Due to this significance, many government agencies and local communities have bolstered the date palm's cultivation and related processing work.
Dabkeh, traditional dance in Palestine	Palestinian women dancing the traditional Dabkeh	2023	01998	The Dabkeh is a social activity and group dance often accompanied by traditional wind instruments and singing. It is performed by eleven dancers, who create a line or semicircle formation and clasp their hands and shoulders to demonstrate cohesion. The dancers jump and hit the ground with their feet. It is performed to spread joy with family, friends, and neighbours, especially during social gatherings. Youth learn the dance and associated crafts through participation at social gatherings, as well as through summer vacation activities, one-on-one training, school and universities, and existing media publications.
Arts, skills and practices associated with engraving on metals (gold, silver and copper) † (Note: Shared with Algeria, Egypt, Iraq, Mauritania, Morocco, Saudi Arabia, Sudan, Tunisia, and Yemen.)		2023	01951	Metals such as gold, silver and copper have been engraved for centuries. Using various tools, symbols, names, Quran verses, prayers and geometric patterns are cut into the metals. The meanings and uses of the engraved metals will vary by community. However, they can be used for jewelry, household objects, wedding gifts, traditional medicine, and in religious ceremonies. The engraving techniques are taught by family members, although they can also be passed down through formal means—such as universities, workshops, organizations and organizations—as well as informal ones like cultural events, publications, and social media.
Henna, rituals, aesthetic and social practices † (Note: Shared with Algeria, Saudi Arabia, Bahrain, Egypt, United Arab Emirates, Iraq, Jordan, Kuwait, Morocco, Mauritania, Oman, Qatar, Sudan, Tunisia, and Yemen.)	A Palestinian woman showing her henna-covered hand.	2024	02116	Derived from a deciduous tree, henna is a paste used for temporary adornments on the body, usually the hands and feet. The tree is considered sacred in North African and Middle Eastern communities, sometimes being used in traditional medicine. the leaves are harvested twice a year and processed to create a paste. Songs, proverbs, poems, and other practices are tied with the tradition of using henna.
Tradition of Nabulsi soap making in Palestine	Green, white, and cream-colored Nabulsi soap for sale in woven baskets and paper boxes	2024	02112	Nabulsi soap is handcrafted from local olive oil, water and lye. After the olive harvest, the soap is made, with the creator's family's stamp added, and stored for a year. Family members, regardless of gender, help with all stages of the soap-making. The tradition is passed down through practice. This handcrafted soap is usually sold, but can also given as a gift for special occasions or for visitors. The practice reflects the Palestinians' connection to nature and brings communities together.
Arabic Kohl † (Note: Shared with Iraq, Jordan, Libya, Oman, Saudi Arabia, Syria, Tunisia, and the United Arab Emirates.)		2025	02261	Kohl is a black eyeliner used by people regardless of gender. It is used across the Arab world, being especially important for Bedouin and other nomadic tribes, Marshland, rural, and fishing communities. It is made using natural ingredients for cosmetic reasons and protection against the elements; although the preparation varies regionally, it is made at gatherings for celebrations like religious festivities or as a part of everyday life. The practice is primarily passed down from mothers to their daughters and granddaughters although other oral traditions, community events, schools and cultural institutions also play a role. Containers for kohl called makhala are passed down as heirlooms.

== See also ==
- List of World Heritage Sites in the Arab states
  - List of World Heritage Sites in Palestine
- Destruction of cultural heritage during the Gaza war
- Culture of Palestine
- Tourism in Palestine
