= Palestinian hikaye =

Palestinian women's oral literature

Hikaye
- Stylistic origins: Folk tales
- Cultural origins: Palestinian
- Formats: Oral

Palestinian Hikaye
- UNESCO Intangible Cultural Heritage
- Country: Palestine
- Reference: 00124
- Region: Arab States

Inscription history
- Inscription: 2008 (3rd session)
- List: Representative

Hikaye, or Palestinian hikaye (Arabic: حكاية, romanized: ḥikāya), is a unique form of oral literature from Palestine that is performed by women, particularly those who are older.

In 2005, it was listed as a Masterpiece of the Oral and Intangible Heritage of Humanity by UNESCO, and in 2008, it was inscribed to UNESCO's List of Intangible Cultural Heritage. However, as a result of changing social structures, broader access to school education, and the spread of mass media, the tradition is slowly dying out.

== Background ==
Hikaye are a unique form of literature, taking the form of educational folk tales passed down orally by older Palestinian women to other younger women and children. Usually performed in the fallahi or madani dialects of Arabic, they are intended for entertainment and education, and are mostly performed in a domestic environment, usually in winter.

Typically recited using an expressive tone, these spoken works discuss social issues and histories, particularly those that impact women. They may criticise society to provoke discussion and debate, or may have an archival function recording memories of displacement. Whilst young boys might practice hikaye, as they grow older they are expected to no longer participate.

== Written literature ==
Ibrahim Muhawi and Sharif Kanaana collected a total of 45 hikaye from the Gaza Strip, the West Bank and Galilee. These were published in English translation in 1989 under the title Speak Bird, Speak Again and in Arabic in 2001. The anthology was subsequently translated into Spanish and French. In 2007, the Palestinian Ministry of Education confiscated around 1,500 copies of the book from public school libraries on the grounds that the stories used colloquial and sometimes offensive language that was unsuitable for teaching children. However, after a storm of public outrage, this decision was soon withdrawn.

== UNESCO listings ==
The Hikaye narrative form has been listed by UNESCO as one of the masterpieces of the oral and intangible heritage of humanity since 2005. In 2008, the art form was inscribed to UNESCO's List of Intangible Cultural Heritage. The bid to UNESCO was prepared with community organisations, such as the Arab Women's Union, the Society of Insha al-Usra, and the Qattan Foundation, amongst others.

== Decline ==
Hikaye is in decline due to the influence of mass media, which often induce people to regard their native customs as backward and inferior. As a consequence, the elder women tend to change form and content of the narrations. The continued disruption of the social life due to the current political situation in Palestine is another threat to the continuation of the Hikaye. However, since 2021 there has been some revival in the practice.

== See also ==
- Intangible Cultural Heritage of Palestine
- Turkish hikaye
- Speak, Bird, Speak Again
