= Turkish hikaye =

Genre of narration

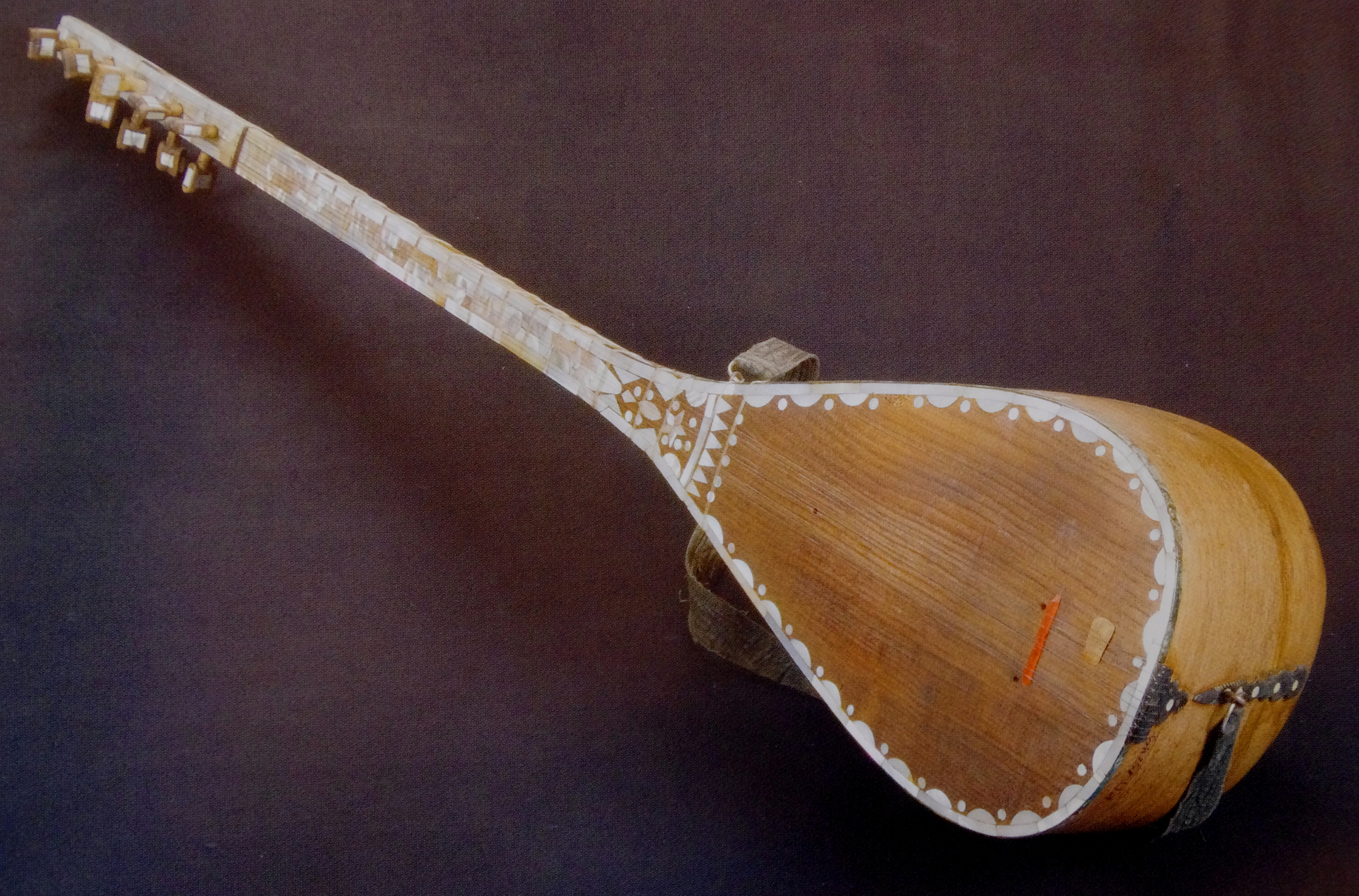
Saz

Turkish hikaye (Turkish: Hikâye) is a narrative genre, which is a mixture of prose and poetry. Prose, the dominant part is narrated by an ashik and is interspersed with poems sung by the same artist to the accompaniment of saz.

Hikaye is an Arabic word that means "tale". In modern Turkish this word refers to the tales of ashiks and can be translated as "folk romance". The hikâye revolves around the amorous exploits of an ashik. The ashik's separation from his love interest throughout the main narrative does not result from his beloved's coy or cruel volition but rather from external circumstances such as meddlesome parents and rivals. Hikayeh is akin to the, more general, genre known in the Central Asia as Dastan. Indeed, in Azerbaijani language the word "dastan" is literally equivalent to hikaye, and its Turkish cognate "destan" is also used to refer to this genre.

== Morphology of hikaye ==
Amelia Gallagher, based on the works of İlhan Başgöz summarizes the morphology of hikaye as the following: The hikaye commences with the ashik's birth and concludes with his marriage. To establish the ashik's initial situation, his family is described in a given time and place. Subsequently, a crisis manifests, typically the lack of a child, which is resolved when the child is born. The ashik faces a pivotal crisis in the narrative during adolescence. When he falls in love the ashik accesses a divine gift—the ability to express his love in poetic song. In the context of performance, the saz accompanies the ashik throughout. The central crisis in the narrative arises from the ashik's separation from his beloved. A series of obstacles and adventures comprise the remainder of the hikâye, as the ashik endeavors to re-unite with his beloved. During times of trial and exuberance, the ashik turns to poetic song to express his elation, desperation, and distress.

== Famous hikayes ==
As the art of ashik is based on oral tradition, the number of hikayes can be as many as the ashiks themselves. İlhan Başgöz, reporting on the hikaye telling in the coffeehouses in Azerbaijan cities, had observed that ashika generally alter a given hikaye depending on the circumstances. Therefore, hikayes have evolved over time and a refined version of the most famous ones have survived to our times. İlhan Başgöz lists 26 hikayes which were popular in Tabriz in late 1960s. In the following we present a brief list of the most famous hikayes:

- Shah Ismail
- The Epic of Köroğlu
- Ashiq Qərib
- Aşıq Valeh

== See also ==
- Dastan
- Palestinian hikaye
