= The Coffeehouse of Ashiks =

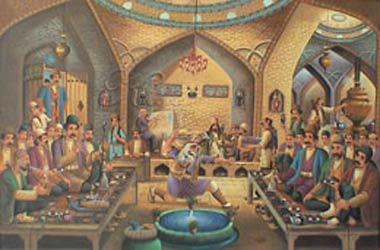
The Coffeehouse of Ashiks

The Coffeehouse of Ashiks (Persian: قهوه‌خانه عاشیقلار, Azerbaijani: Aşıqlar Qəhvəsi) is a coffeehouse in cities of Azerbaijan where ashiks perform Turkish hikaye.

In cities, towns, and villages of Iranian Azerbaijan ashiks entertain audiences in coffeehouses. According to İlhan Başgöz, in late 1960s coffeehouses dedicated for ashik performance were located in major urban centers and their customers consisted of peasants or tribesmen who came to city for some business. The most famous among these coffeehouses was the "Coffeehouse of Husein Tirandaz" in Tabriz. Since early 1970s leftist intellectuals frequented this particular coffeehouse and, by mid 1970s, transformed it to the focal point of student movement.

For a decade after the Iranian revolution, all ashik performances were banned. According to the recent reports ashik coffeehouses are thriving again and are promoted as the tourist attraction sites.
