= Efrat (organization) =

Israeli pro-life family planning organization

- Founder: Herschel Feigenbaum
- Headquarters: Jerusalem, Israel
- Website: efrat.org.il

Efrat is the largest non-profit organization in Israel dedicated to preventing abortions by Jewish women. Efrat provides emotional, financial, and vocational assistance to pregnant Jewish women who feel pressured to terminate their pregnancy. Efrat supports abortions to save the pregnant woman's life or in cases of severe fetal disability. Until 2021, it was led by Dr. Eli J. Schussheim. The organization operates primarily through volunteer support, providing food, clothing, shelter, and financial assistance to women considering abortion due to financial difficulties.

Efrat has faced criticism from various quarters. Critics argue that the organization's approach can sometimes pressure women into continuing pregnancies against their wishes, potentially leading to hardship for both mother and child. In 2012, Efrat was embroiled in controversy following an incident involving a pregnant teenager and her boyfriend, which resulted in an attempted suicide. Although Efrat denied involvement, the event sparked a backlash and calls for stricter regulation of its activities. Efrat maintains that it does not oppose abortion outright and focuses on ensuring women can make informed and autonomous decisions.

== History and name ==
Efrat was founded in the 1950s by Holocaust survivor Herschel Feigenbaum, who was concerned not that abortions were immoral, but that unnecessary abortions were causing the Jewish population to decline. At the time, abortions were illegal in Israel but were being done anyway. The program increases the number of babies born by reducing the cost to the parents of giving birth and raising the child.

In 1977, Eliyahu Schussheim took over as the medical director, a post he held until his death in 2021. He was motivated in part due to medical misinformation and the value of education instead of coercion or confrontation, often telling the story of a pregnant woman who had been given incorrect advice based on outdated information about the risks of birth defects from a medical X-ray, or showing potential donors a 2002 news article about a woman who had an abortion because she was in debt.

The name "Efrat" comes from I Chronicles, where it is the name of Caleb's wife, who, according to Jewish tradition, is Miriam, sister of Moses, who saved him as a baby. The Midrash Rabbah writes, "Why was she called Efrat? Because Israel was fruitful ("paru") and multiplied through her." This refers to her actions against Pharaoh's decree of infanticide, by which she saved the lives of many Israelite children. Originally, the full name for the organization was "Efrat, The Right to Live", but this was changed to "Efrat, Association for the Encouragement of Childbirth among the Jewish People" or the "Association for the Encouragement of the Increase in the Birth Rate Among the Jewish People" after the name was criticized.

== Activities ==
According to Eli Schussheim, the former president of Efrat, most abortions in Israel are motivated by financial difficulties, rather than the desire to not be pregnant or to not have children. Even in the case of an abortion due to fetal abnormality, an abortion may be sought partly due to the financial burden of caring for a disabled child, especially in the Haredi community, where the mothers are the main breadwinners for the family and also the main caretakers of the children. Efrat provides food, clothing, shelter, diapers, baby furniture, and other financial assistance to Israeli women who feel that they would otherwise need to have an abortion for financial reasons. They also have a social worker who can help them apply for state-funded welfare programs.

Most of the assistance is provided by volunteers.

Volunteers provide emotional support and help with needs such as finding temporary housing or obtaining legal assistance. They have about 3,000 volunteers.

Some clients are provided with medical consultations, such as to review a report describing a birth defect. The group supports abortion to save the life of the mother or in cases of severe birth defects.

Efrat deals with adult women and most of the women that turn to Efrat are married.

Women who wish to receive financial assistance must apply for it and be approved by the organization. The main goal is to identify Jewish women who would continue their pregnancies if they receive financial assistance but would have an abortion otherwise. They serve Jewish women and may refer non-Jewish Israeli women to a Christian anti-abortion group, Be'ad Chaim. (Jewish and Christian Messianic anti-abortion groups typically do not affiliate with each other in Israel.)

== Funding ==
They receive no money from the Israeli government. A significant portion of their budget comes from anti-abortion Americans. Some synagogues collect donations when the Torah portion about the Miriam and the midwives saving the Israelite babies is read.

== Locations ==
The organization's main offices are located in Jerusalem. In 2023, they opened a maternity home to help homeless women during and after pregnancy.

== Political stance ==
Efrat has traditionally avoided political lobbying, and thinks that showy protests are ineffective. However, they have responded to some political situations. In 1997, they opposed an anti-abortion bill put forward by the ultra-Orthodox Shas party that would have treated providing an abortion as first-degree murder. When questioned by a committee in the Knesset in 2014, Efrat recommended that Israel reduce the barriers to abortion by eliminating a requirement for approval by a committee. On the other hand, in the late 1990s, they distributed a translated copy of the anti-abortion propaganda film, The Silent Scream, to all members of the Israeli parliament.

They frame their work in terms of women's rights and the right of informed consent. Their main political stance is about the vulnerability of the Jewish population, and some of their advertisements have expressed concern about too few Jewish babies being born. They describe their activities as saving lives and a type of "internal aliyah". Their donor-oriented advertisements have claim that they are "making a demographic difference for Israel" and "strengthening the Jewish people". As a practical matter, they believe that a woman cannot have personal agency and make her own choice if she can not financially support the results of her preferred choice.

Their volunteers have traditionally not joined anti-abortion protests, used disturbing imagery, promoted religious claims against abortion, or otherwise engaged in the kinds of activities that characterize the United States anti-abortion movement. In 2013, Schussheim said that "Efrat has never claimed that abortion is murder". However, over time, scholars have observed more American influence and more US-style rhetoric from the organization. Efrat is not a religious organization and does not make any statement regarding the religious or moral standing of abortion.

== Awards ==
In 2012, Efrat received the annual "Jerusalem Prize" by Israeli weekly religious magazine B'Sheva. The award was protested by feminist activists opposing the organization, especially in light of the 2012 attempted double suicide incident, but B'Sheva stated that the "unfair opposition from the public and media over the past year" was an additional reason to award the prize to Efrat.

== Criticism ==
=== 2012 attempted suicide ===
In 2012, an unmarried 17-year-old pregnant teen and her 18-year-old boyfriend were in contact with three women who encouraged her not to have an abortion, despite the pressure from the boyfriend's parents, who "insisted" and "demanded" that she have an abortion, even though the pregnant teen did not want an abortion. The couple formed a suicide pact and announced their plan to a television channel. When the police found them, the boyfriend threatened to murder his girlfriend and then shot at the police, slightly wounding one. The girlfriend, who had changed her mind about suicide, escaped from the car. The police returned fire, killing him.

Efrat denied having had any contact with the couple. The women may not have been affiliated with the organization. The event resulted in an online petition against Efrat's legal recognition as a non-profit organization and condemnation by women's rights' groups. In response, Efrat claims that it is not opposed to abortion. Additionally, the organization clarified that it does not deal with teenage pregnancies. An investigation of the incident supported the police decision to return fire, but also criticized them for shooting from unsafe positions, as their relative positions put both the pregnant teen (who was unharmed) as well as some of the police at risk from friendly fire. The report also indicated it was unclear whether, in addition to being hit by bullets from the police, the boyfriend had also shot himself in the head.

== See also ==
- Abortion in Israel
- Crisis pregnancy center
