= Ibrahim Muhawi =

Palestinian academic, writer and translator

Ibrahim Muhawi (born 1937, Arabic: إبراهيم مهوي) is a Palestinian academic and writer, specializing in Palestinian and Arabic literature, folklore and translation. He is a member of the Palestinian diaspora.

== Career ==
Muhawi was born in Ramallah in 1937 to a Palestinian Christian Arab family. and, after graduating from the Friends Boys' School in that city, he transferred to the United States in 1959, settling in San Francisco.where he gained a degree in electrical engineering at Heald Engineering College. Drawn to literature in the meantime, he took out a B.A. in English (1964: magna cum laude) from California State University at Hayward, and went on to obtain an M.A. (1966) and a Ph.D. (1969), in the same subject from the University of California, Davis.

After a stint as English lecturer at Brock University. in St. Catharines, Ontario (1969-1975), Muhawi took up a post at the University of Jordan in Amman (1975-1977), and then went to the West Bank to serve as chair of the department of English at Birzeit University (1978 to 1980). Courtesy Professor in the Comparative Literature Program at the University of Oregon in Eugene (2007).

Muhawi is a world authority on the Palestinian poet Mahmoud Darwish, and has translated both his memoir of the 1982 Israeli invasion of Lebanon and the poet's experience of house arrest, detentions in prison and interrogations by Israeli soldiers interrogators.

== Views on Palestinian diaspora (shatat) ==
Muhawi notes that the Balfour Declaration, with its outline of a policy of establishing a homeland for the Jewish people in Palestine, referred to the actual historic majority of the population in purely negative terms: indigenous Palestinians were 'non-Jews', as the phrasing in the document, 'the existing non-Jewish population', shows. The paradoxical consequence of this distinction was to transform the native inhabitants into a diaspora people in their own country. Balfour himself duplicated as an historical event what a tribal god, Yahweh had done for the mythical figure of Moses: on both occasions, real and imagined, an external authority, speaking in a tongue unknown to the autochthonous people, promised their land to another people. In addressing the Peel Commission in 1937, Winston Churchill was later to dismissively liken Palestinian claims to their country as equal to those of a dog in a manger: though it might have resided there a long time, 'a higher grade of race' takes over the place. Churchill, Muhawi argues, was following a long line of earlier writers in dumbing down Palestinians to a bestial level, and the tradition was still alive, with Menachem Begin likening Palestinians to cockroaches, and Golda Meir denying them out of existence. The tradition of foreign narratives about Palestine is one wherein the actual realities, especially that of the Palestinian people, are wholly erased by a prior sacred tale, that of the Bible whose language becomes the only significant, and signifying reality, replacing reality itself. Palestine, as experienced by Palestinians, is no longer a place but rather:

a tablet; or rather it is a place only to the extent that it is a tablet upon which holy characters are scribbled. We, the people of Palestine, our customs and manners, are nothing more than representative scribbles on the surface of this tablet.

== Awards ==
Muhawi's translation of Mahmoud Darwish's Journal of an Ordinary Grief. won the 2011 PEN Translation Prize.

In 2024, he won the 2023 Translation Award at the 12th annual Palestine Book Awards (PBA) for Among the Almond Trees: A Palestinian Memoir, originally written by Hussein Barghouthi.

== Translations ==
- with Sharif Kanaana, Speak, bird, speak again:Palestinian Arab folk tales, University of California Press 1989 (available on-line here), featuring Palestinian hikaye
- Maḥmūd Darwīsh, Memory for Forgetfulness,(Dhākira li l-nisyān) University of California Press,1995. This is, for Muhawi, a 'quintessential piece of diasporic literature.'
- Maḥmūd Darwīsh, Journal of an ordinary grief, (Yawmiyyât al-Huzn al-‘Âdî, 1973) Steerforth Press, 2012
