= Speak, Bird, Speak Again =

1989 collection of Palestinian folk tales

Speak, Bird, Speak Again Palestinian folktales

Speak, Bird, Speak Again: A book of Palestinian folk tales is a book first published in English in 1989 by Palestinian authors Ibrahim Muhawi and professor of sociology and anthropology at Bir Zeit University Sharif Kanaana.

After the original English book of 1989, a French version, published by UNESCO, followed in 1997, and an Arabic one in Lebanon in 2001.

The book contains a collection of 45 Palestinian folk tales, including Palestinian hikaye, drawn from a collection of two hundred tales narrated by women from different areas of the region of Palestine (the Galilee, the West Bank, and Gaza). The stories collected were chosen on the basis of their popularity, their aesthetic and narrative qualities, and what they tell about popular Palestinian culture dating back many centuries. The authors spent 30 years collecting the material for the book.

The English version of the book is studied as part of literature courses at both University of California at Berkeley and Chicago University, and Kana'nah himself taught the study of the book in the masters programs at Bir Zeit University.

Some of the folk tales from Speak, Bird, Speak Again have been used in other collections/books:

- Margareth Read MacDonald, Alik Arzoumanian (ill), (2006): Tunjur! Tunjur! Tunjur! A Palestinian Folktale, ISBN 978-0-7614-5225-6, is based on the "Tunjur, Tunjur" story, first told by Fatme Abdel Qader, Arrabe, Galilee, for Speak, Bird, Speak Again.
- Sonia Nimr (Introduction by Ghada Karmi), (2007): Ghaddar the Ghoul and other Palestinian Stories, ISBN 978-1-84507-523-1, contains the story "Hasan and the Golden Feather", which is based on the story entitled "Bushel of Gold" (or "The Golden Pail") in Speak, Bird, Speak Again.

== Controversy ==
In 2007, the Hamas-run Palestinian Authority (PA) banned the book and issued a directive to pull Professor Kanaana's book from school libraries and destroy it; however, the ban was later lifted. The book was misinterpreted, explained the author, "since it was not meant to be taught to children, as it is taught at the masters and doctorate level [in literature studies]."

The Palestinian novelist Zakaria Mohammed warned that Hamas' decision to ban the book, which is a collection of 45 folk tales, was "only the beginning" and he urged intellectuals to take action. He said: "If we don't stand up to the Islamists now, they won't stop confiscating books, songs and folklore".

The decision to ban the book was shortly thereafter reversed due to widespread outcry.

== See also ==
- Palestinian literature

== External references ==
- Full online version
