= Culture of Palestine =

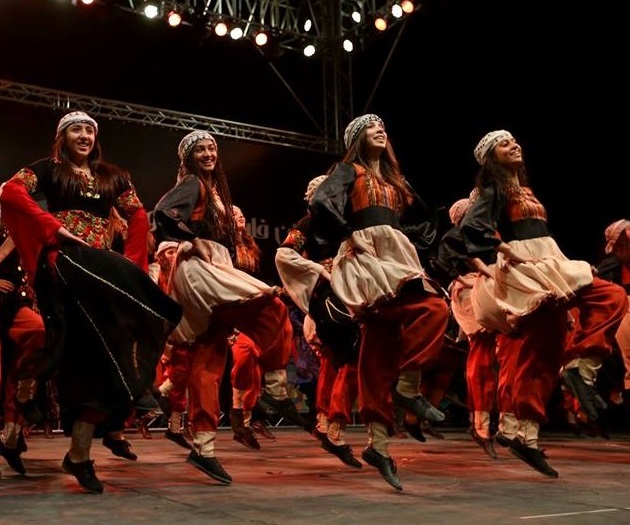
Palestinian girls dancing dabke

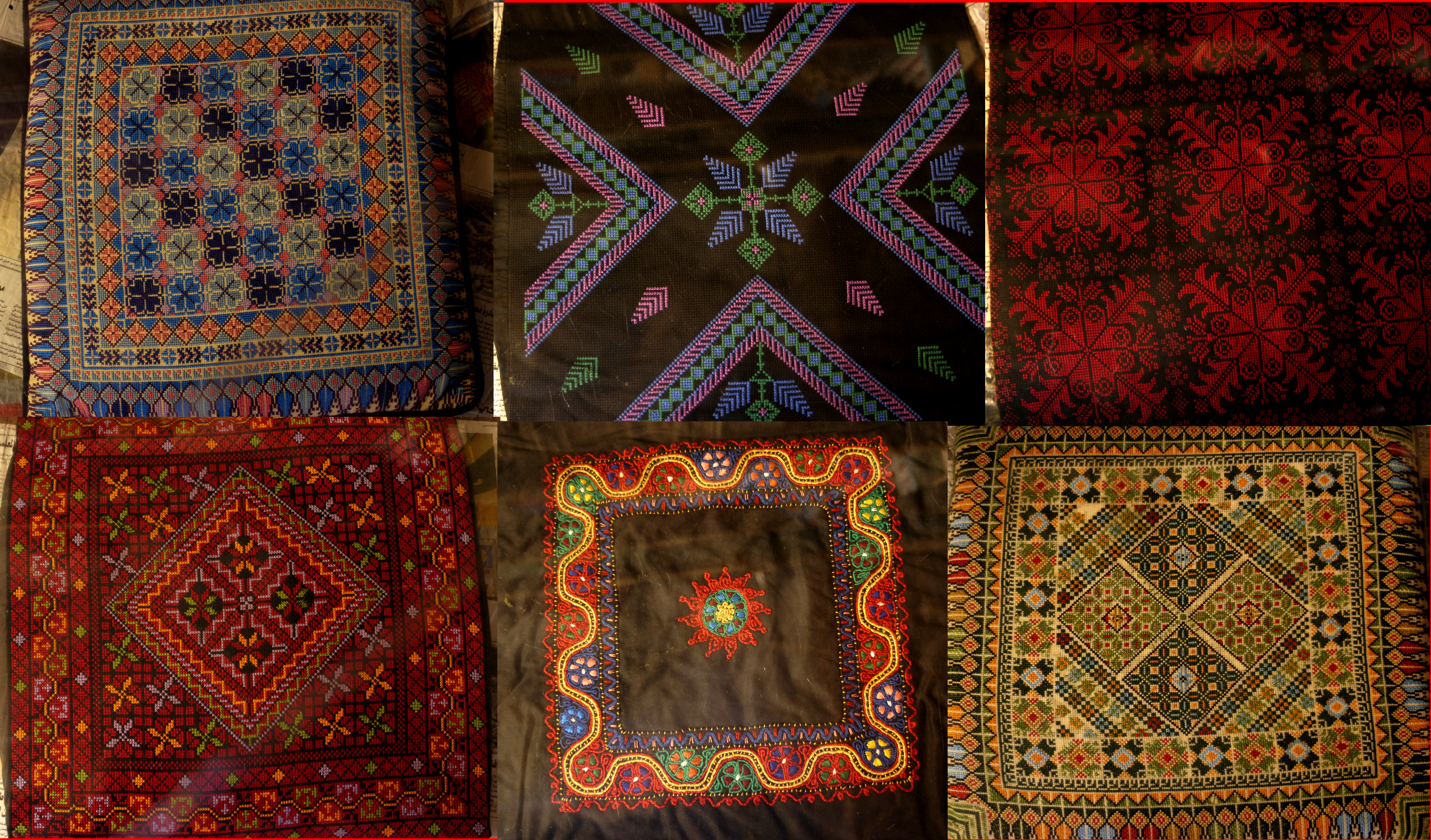
Palestinian embroidery

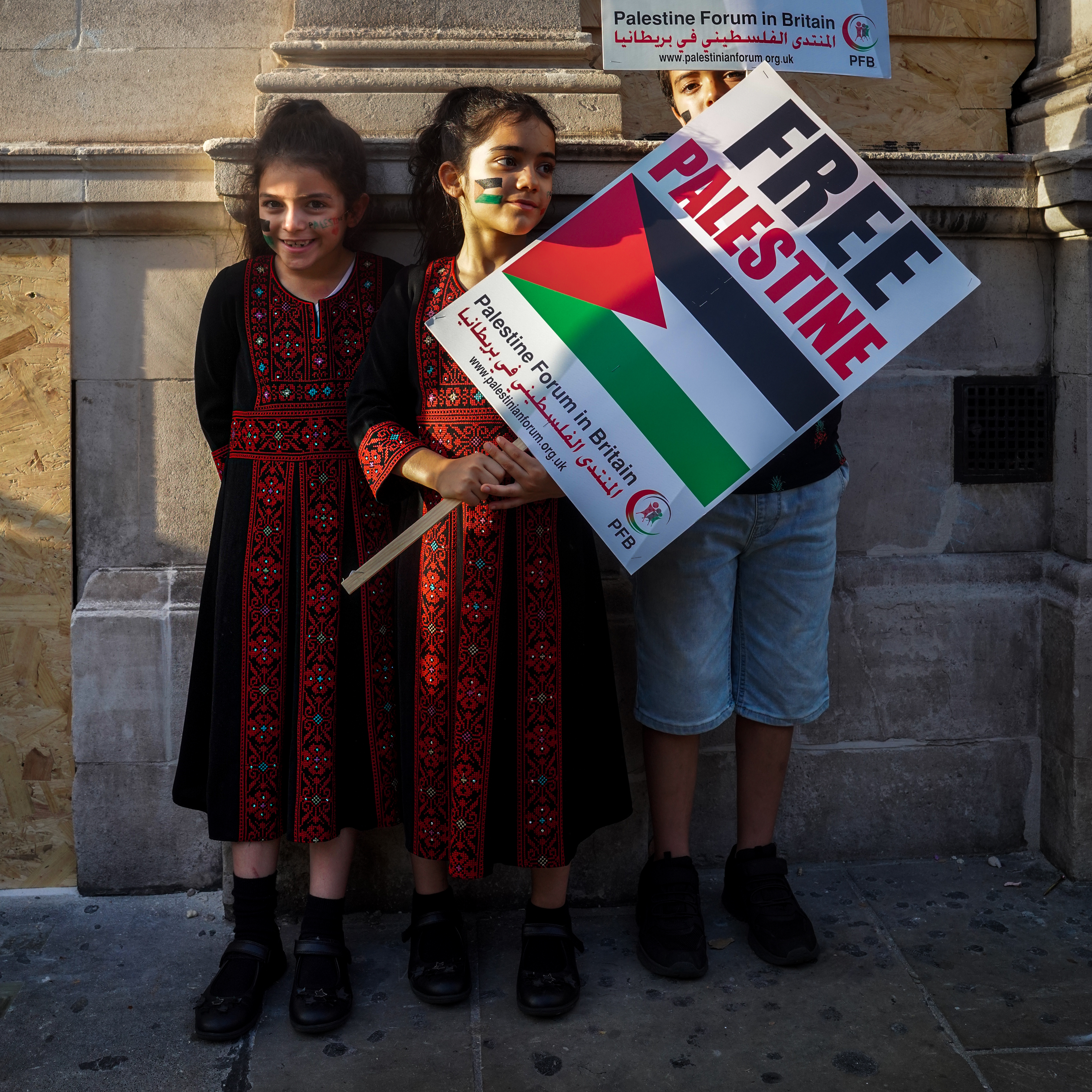
Palestinian children in traditional dress

The culture of Palestine is influenced by the many diverse cultures and religions which have existed in the historical region of Palestine. The cultural and linguistic heritage of Palestinian Arabs along with Lebanese, Syrians, and Jordanians is integral part of Levantine Arab culture. Palestinians also have their own dialect of Arabic, the Palestinian dialect.

Cultural contributions to the fields of art, literature, music, costume and cuisine express the Palestinian identity despite the geographical separation between the Palestinians from the Palestinian territories, Palestinian citizens of Israel and Palestinians in the diaspora.

Palestinian culture consists of food, dance, legends, oral history, proverbs, jokes, popular beliefs, customs, and comprising the traditions (including oral traditions) of Palestinian culture. The folklorist revival among Palestinian intellectuals such as Nimr Sirhan, Musa Allush, Salim Mubayyid, and others emphasized pre-Islamic cultural roots.

Palestine's significant intangible cultural heritage has been recognised by UNESCO, with a first inscription for Palestinian hikaye made in 2008 to its list of intangible cultural heritage. This was followed by a further listing in 2021 for Palestinian embroidery, folk dance dabke in 2023, Nabulsi soap in 2024, as well as joint listings with other Arab States for calligraphy, knowledge and use of the date palm, metal engraving arts and practices and the art of henna.

== Traditional wear ==
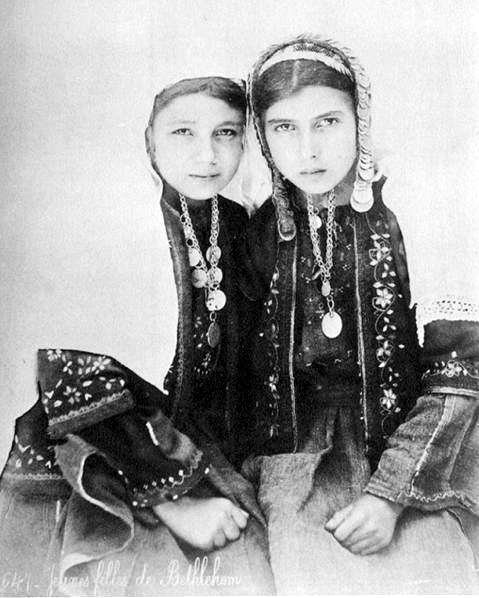
Girls in Bethlehem costume pre-1885

Foreign travelers to Palestine in the late 19th and early 20th centuries often commented on the rich variety of traditional clothing among the Palestinian people, and particularly among the fellaheen or village women. Until the 1940s, a woman's economic status, whether married or single, and the town or area they were from could be deciphered by most Palestinian women by the type of cloth, colors, cut, and embroidery motifs, or lack thereof, used for the robe-like dress or "thoub" in Arabic.

The 1948 Palestinian expulsion and flight led to a disruption in traditional modes of dress and customs, as many women who had been displaced could no longer afford the time or money to invest in complex embroidered garments. New styles began to appear the 1960s. For example, the "six-branched dress" named after the six wide bands of embroidery running down from the waist. These styles came from the refugee camps, particularly after 1967. Individual village styles were lost and replaced by an identifiable "Palestinian" style. The shawal, a style popular in the West Bank and Jordan before the First Intifada, probably evolved from one of the many welfare embroidery projects in the refugee camps. It was a shorter and narrower fashion, with a western cut. The keffiyeh, also known as "hattah", is a traditional black and white headdress worn by Palestinian farmers. Since the Arab Revolt of the 1930s, it has become a prominent symbol of Palestinian resistance in the Israeli Palestinian conflict.

In 2021 Palestinian embroidery was inscribed to UNESCO's list of intangible cultural heritage.

== Dance ==
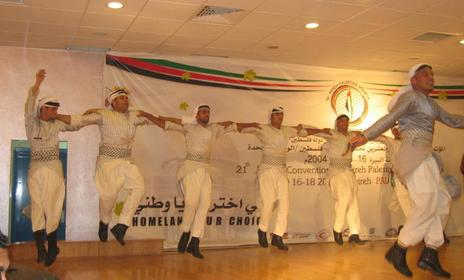
Palestinian Dabke folk dance as performed by men

Dabke (Arabic: دبكة), is a folk dance that originates from the Levant. It is popular in Palestinian culture and many other cultures in the Levant, and many troupes perform the dance throughout the world. The Dabke is marked by synchronized jumping, stamping, and movement, similar to tap dancing.

== Folk tales ==
Traditional storytelling among Palestinians is prefaced with an invitation to the listeners to give blessings to God and the Prophet Mohammed or the Virgin Mary as the case may be, and includes the traditional opening: "There was, in the oldness of time ..." Formulaic elements of the stories share much in common with the wider Arab world, though the rhyming scheme is distinct. There are a cast of supernatural characters: Jinss and Djinns who can cross the Seven Seas in an instant, giants, and ghouls with eyes of ember and teeth of brass.

Palestinian folk tales often include stories and anecdotes about Saint George, the patron saint of Palestine. For instance, one story from the village of Ein Karem includes a visit from Saint George during a drought. Oftentimes, folk tales of Saint George are a source of endurance and hope for Palestinians, both Muslim and Christian.

Palestinian hikaye is a form of women's oral literature that addresses social questions. Performed in winter, older women address the stories to younger women and children. In 2008 it was inscribed to UNESCO's list of intangible cultural heritage.

== Music ==
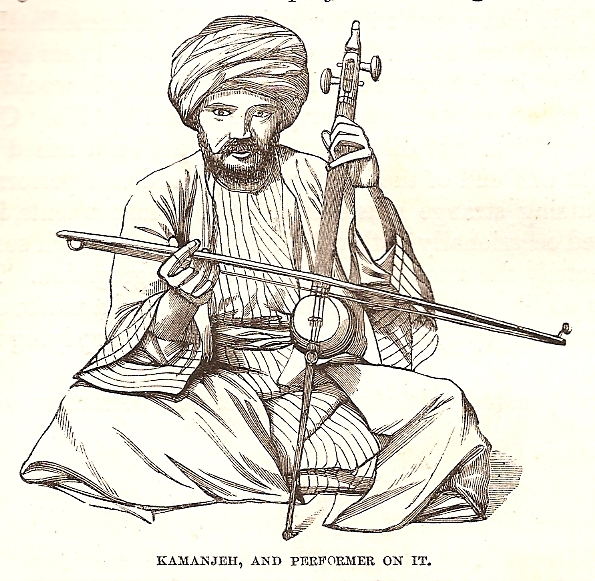
Kamanjeh performer in Jerusalem, 1859.

Traditional Palestinian songs have no set lyrics but rather a set rhythm to them, allowing for improvised folk poetry lyrics. A form of this style of folk singing is Ataaba; it consists of 4 verses, following a specific form and meter. The distinguishing feature of ataaba is that the first three verses end with the same word meaning three different things, and the fourth verse serves as a conclusion. The Ataaba continues to be performed at weddings and festivals in Arab localities in Israel, the West Bank and Gaza Strip.

Other traditional Palestinian song styles include zajal, Bein Al-dawai, Al-Rozana, Zarif – Al-Toul, Al-Maijana, Sahja/Saamir and Zaghareed.

Over three decades, the Palestinian National Music and Dance Troupe (El Funoun) and Mohsen Subhi have reinterpreted and rearranged traditional wedding songs such as Mish'al (1986), Marj Ibn 'Amer (1989) and Zaghareed (1997).

== Theater ==
Palestinian theater resembles other Arab theaters, but differs significantly because of the history of the area and its people. It came about with difficulty and was initially focused inward, but has since grown into a distinct cultural practice. Marie Elias, in the Interactive Encyclopedia of the Palestine Question, recognizes three different stages. Palestinian theater started in the "context of a cultural renaissance" across the Levant and particularly in the 1920s, with productions based on Arab texts or translated European plays. A second period a "rebirth" occurred in the late 1960s, and after the Six-Day War of 1967 "a clear, but uncoordinated, desire was expressed, both within Palestine and abroad, to develop theater with a Palestinian identity", according to Elias. A notable group from that period is the Balalin Theater Troupe, which had started in 1970 as the Theater Family troupe. A third period started in 1993, after the Oslo Agreement, which saw a professionalization in the West Bank, though developments in the Gaza Strip were much more difficult.

== Architecture ==
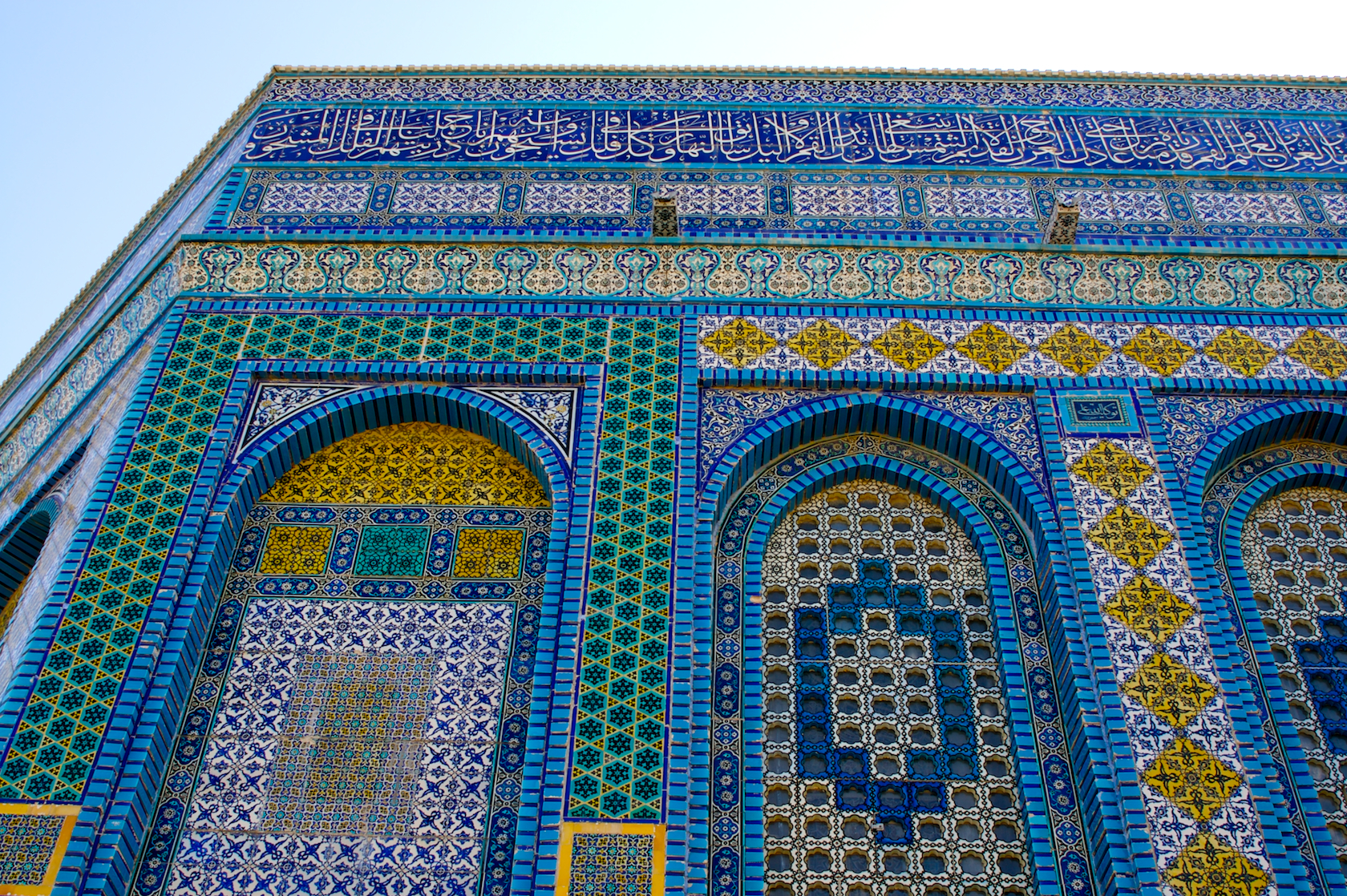
Dome of the Rock mosaic art

Traditional Palestinian architecture covers a vast historical time frame and a number of different styles and influences over the ages. The urban architecture of Palestine prior to 1850 was relatively sophisticated. While it belonged to greater geographical and cultural context of the Levant and the Arab world, it constituted a distinct tradition, "significantly different from the traditions of Syria, Lebanon or Egypt." Nonetheless, the Palestinian townhouse shared in the same basic conceptions regarding the arrangement of living space and apartment types commonly seen throughout the Eastern Mediterranean. The rich diversity and underlying unity of the architectural culture of this wider region stretching from the Balkans to North Africa was a function of the exchange fostered by the caravans of the trade routes, and the extension of Ottoman rule over most of this area, beginning in the early 16th century through until the end of World War I.

== Sports ==
Palestinian athletes have competed at every Olympic Games since the 1996 Summer Olympics. The Palestinian Olympic committee did not work with the Israeli Olympic committee to train for the 2012 Olympic games, and participation in the 2013 Mediterranean Games.

Games inherited from the Ottoman era were the starting point of Palestinian sports during the British Mandate. These games included horse racing, running, wrestling and swimming. However, football gained popularity over time.

The true beginning of the phenomenon of establishing social-athletic clubs in Palestine can be traced to the early twentieth century, specifically the 1920s. Since that time, sports – especially football – had become a social tradition; a pivotal part of Palestinian culture. Many of these clubs were established as social-cultural clubs.

Only a few clubs were established solely as athletic, while the majority emerged as social and later adopted athletic activities. By 1948, there were some 65 athletic clubs in Palestine; approximately 55 of them were members of the Arab Palestine Sports Federation (APSF) which was established in 1931 and re-established in 1944. These clubs had a tremendous impact on the lives of Palestinian young people, shaping their character and preparing them for social and political involvement.

There is a West Bank Premier League, and Gaza Strip League. The Palestine national football team played Afghanistan in the 2014 FIFA World Cup qualifiers. They visited Australia for the 2015 AFC Asian Cup.

The Beit Jala Lions is a West Bank Rugby Union team.

The Turmus Aya Equestrian Club, established in 2007, is a riding club dedicated to the mission of providing affordable access to horses for Palestinians. Ashraf Rabi, the founder, maintains that "this is part of the development of Palestine. Horses are a big part of our Arab culture and we must embrace it."

== Palestinian art ==
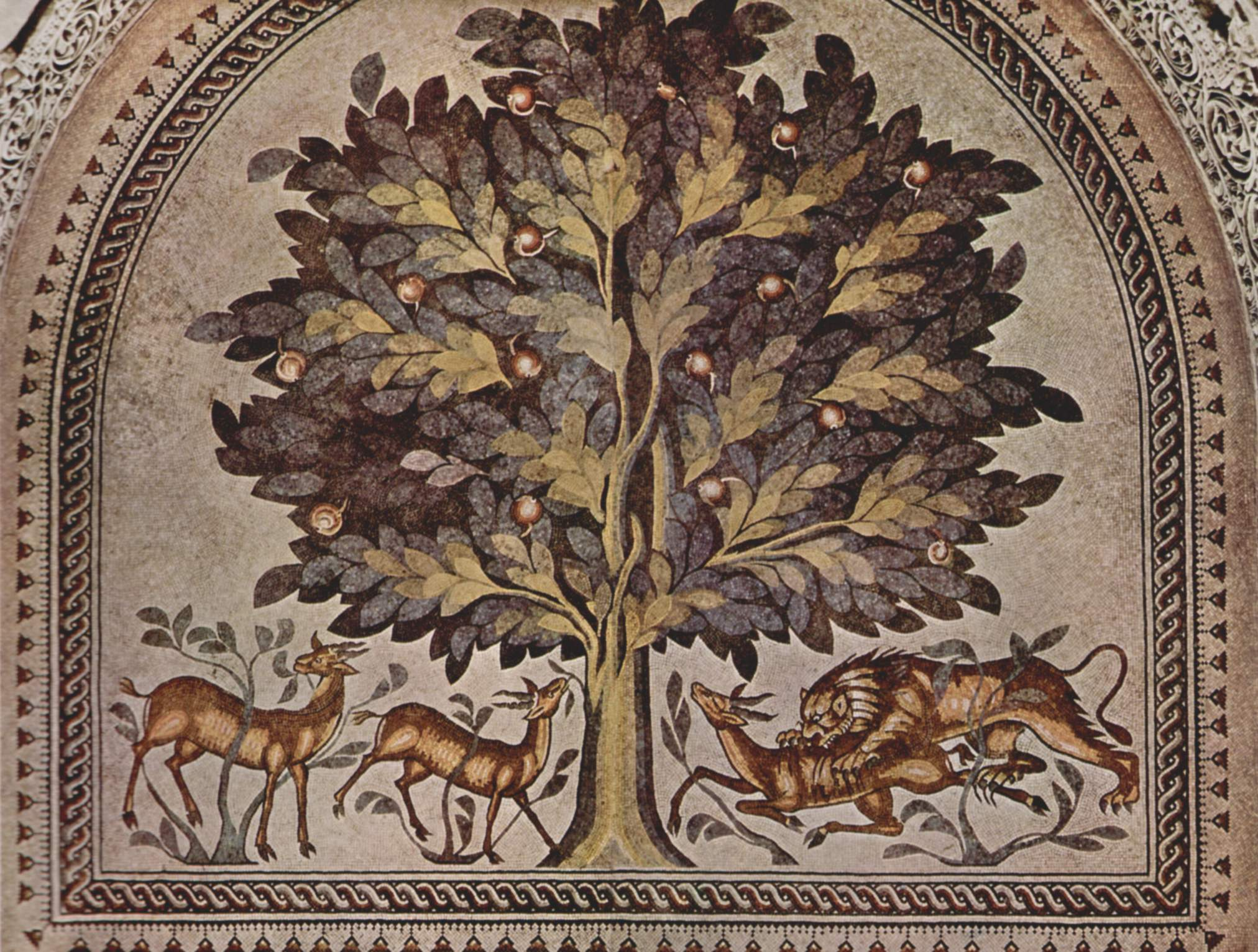
Mosaic plate at Khirbat Al-Mafjar near Jericho c. 735 CE

Similar to the structure of Palestinian society, the Palestinian field of arts extends over three main geographic centers:

1. the West Bank and Gaza Strip
2. the Palestinian diaspora in the Arab world
3. Europe, the United States and elsewhere.

Contemporary Palestinian art finds its roots in folk art and traditional Christian and Islamic painting. After the 1948 Palestinian expulsion and flight, nationalistic themes have predominated as Palestinian artists use diverse media to express and explore their connection to identity and land. In the 1990s Salam Dyab, Hisham Zreiq, Issa Dibe and others began to adopt modern styles and symbolism.

== Modern cuisine ==
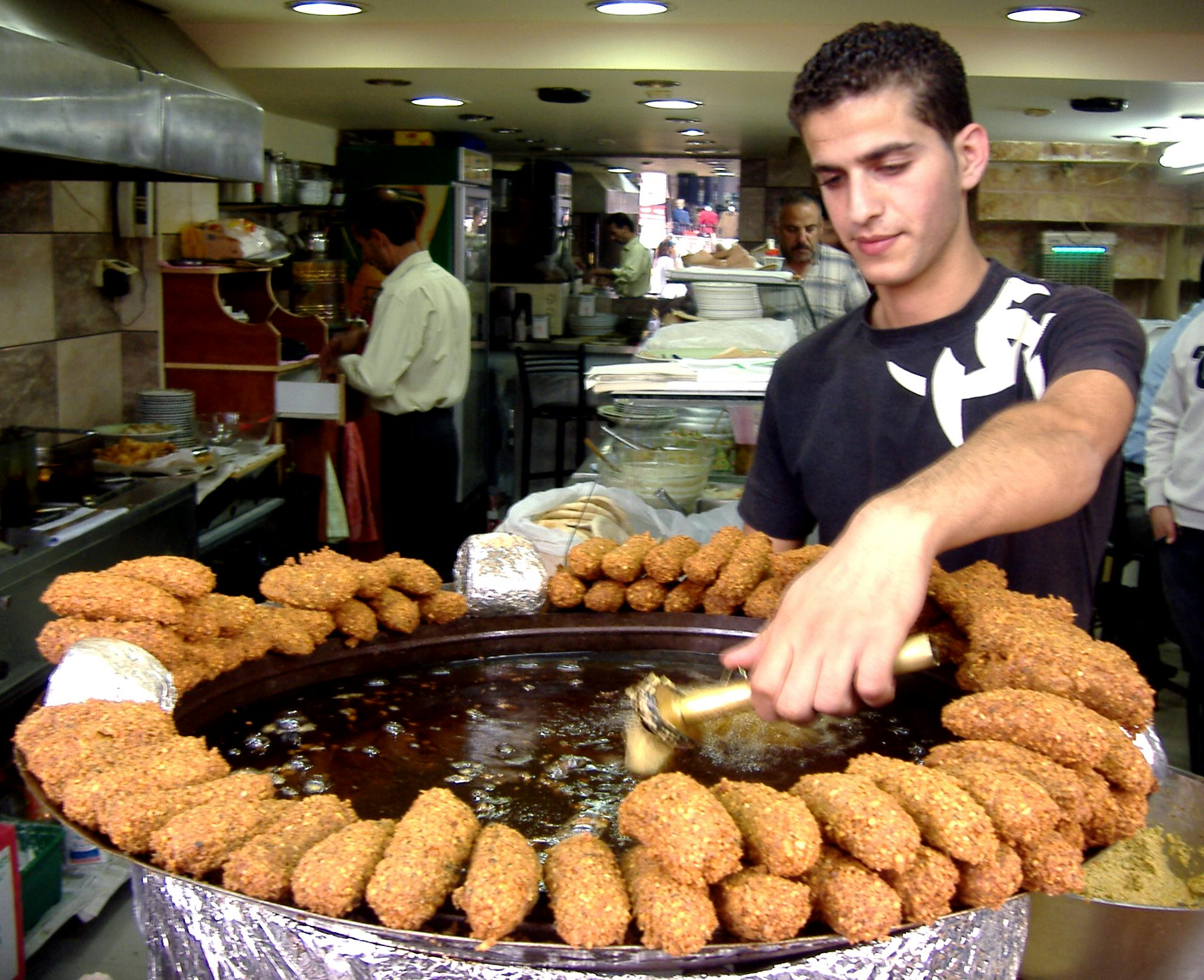
A Palestinian youth serving Falafel in Ramallah

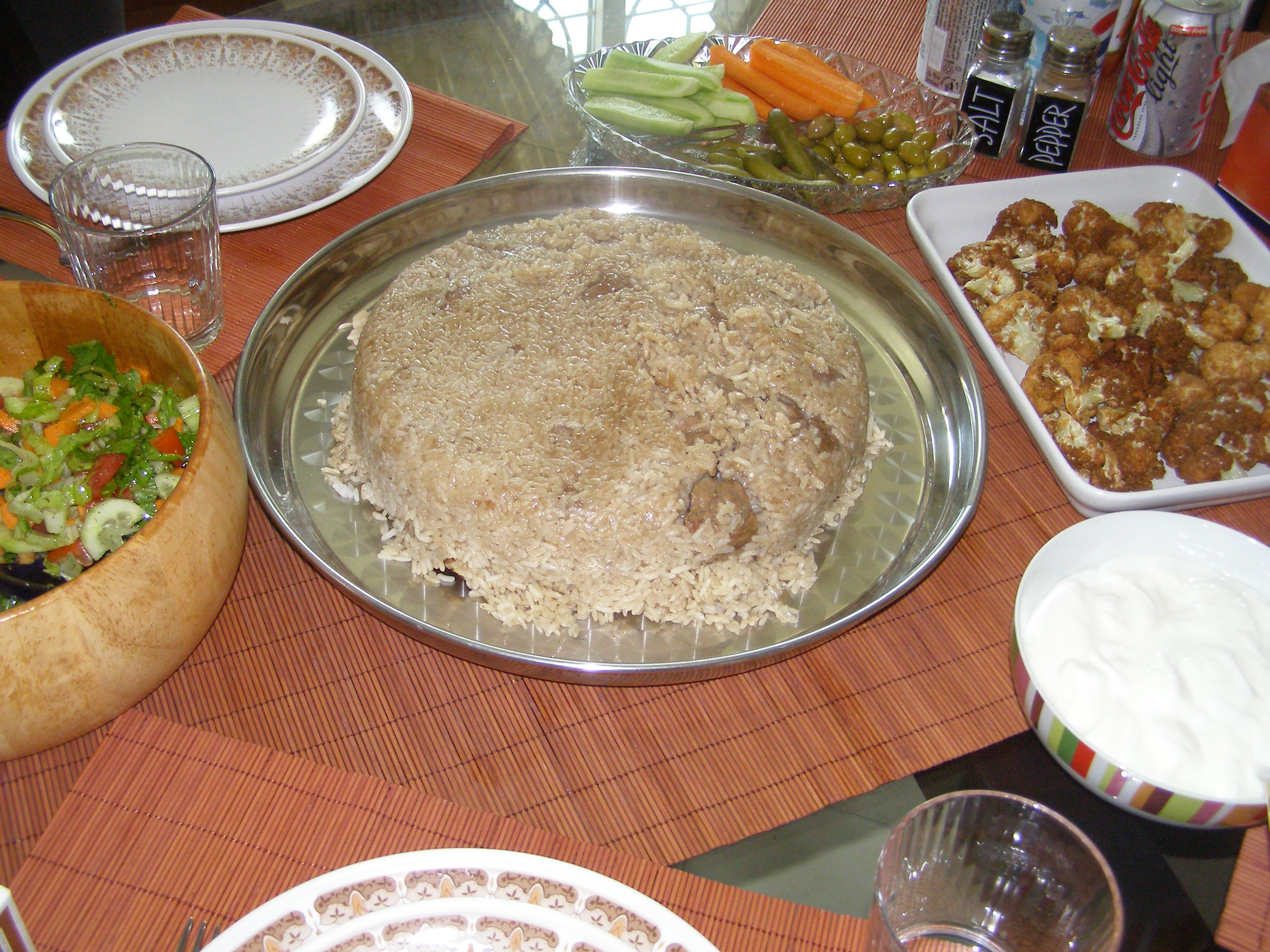
Maqluba

Palestine's history of rule by many different empires is reflected in Palestinian cuisine, which has benefited from various cultural contributions and exchanges. Generally speaking, modern Palestinian dishes have been influenced by the rule of three major Islamic groups: the Arabs, the Persian-influenced Arabs, and the Turks. The original Bedouin Arabs in Syria and Palestine had simple culinary traditions primarily based on the use of rice, lamb and yogurt, as well as dates.

The cuisine of the Ottoman Empire, which incorporated Palestine as one of its provinces between 1517 and 1918, was partially made up of what had become by then a rich Arab cuisine. After the Crimean War, many foreign communities (namely the Bosnians, Greeks, French and Italians) began settling in the area; Jerusalem, Jaffa and Bethlehem were the most popular destinations for these groups. The cuisine of these communities, particularly those of the Balkans, contributed to the character of Palestinian cuisine. Nonetheless, until the 1950s and 1960s, the staple diet for many rural Palestinian families revolved around olive oil, oregano (za'atar) and bread, baked in a simple oven called a taboon.

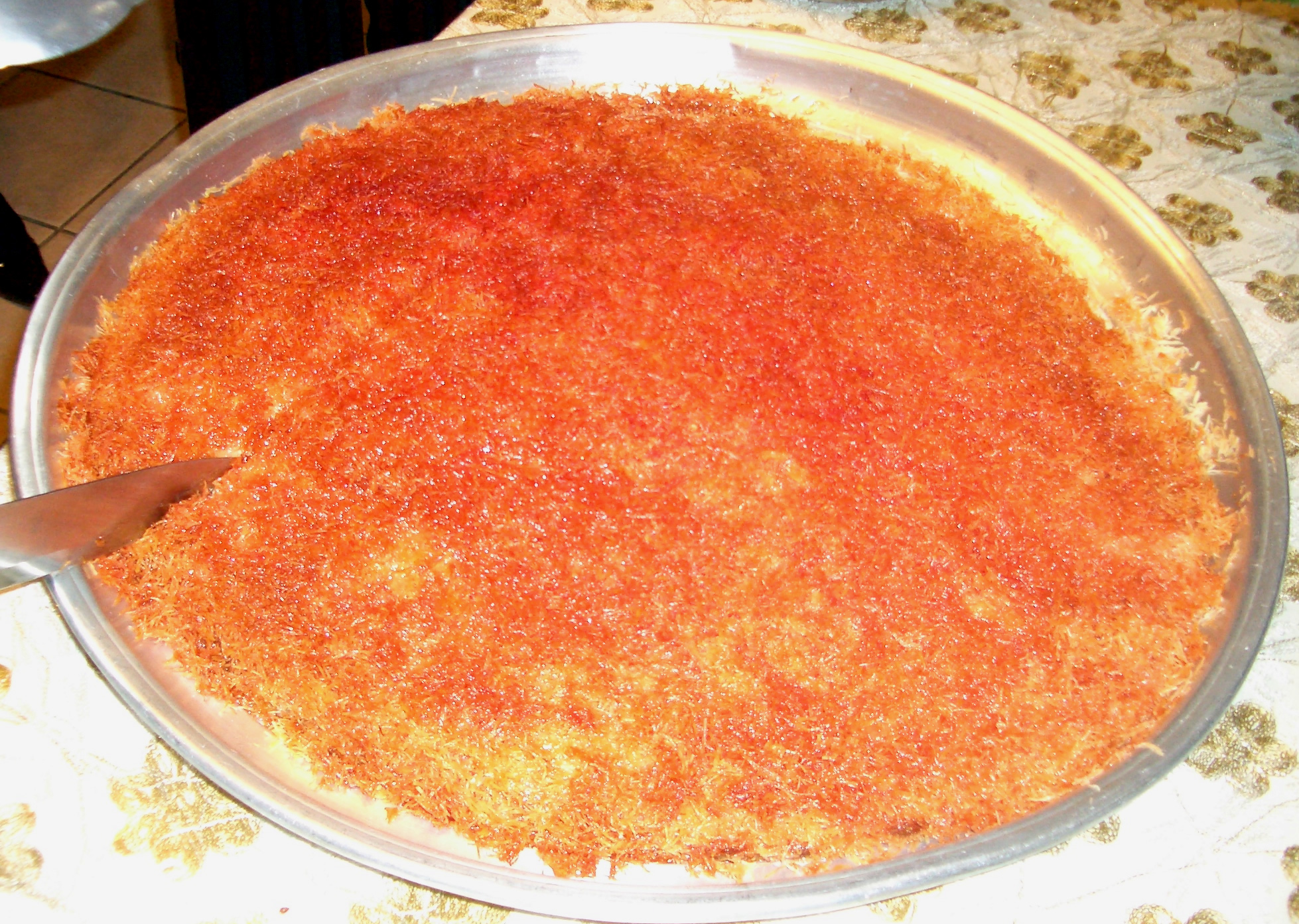
Kanafeh in a pan

Palestinian cuisine is divided into three regional groups: the Galilee, West Bank and Gaza area. Cuisine in the Galilee region shares much in common with Lebanese cuisine, due to extensive communication between the two regions before the establishment of Israel. Galilee inhabitants specialize in producing a number of meals based on the combination of bulgur, spices and meat, known as kibbee by Arabs. Kibbee has several variations including it being served raw, fried or baked. Musakhan is a common main dish that originated in the Jenin and Tulkarm areas of the northern West Bank. It consists of a roasted chicken over a taboon bread that has been topped with pieces of fried sweet onions, sumac, allspice and pine nuts, cooked and finished with a generous helping of olive oil. Other meals common to the area are maqluba and mansaf, the latter originating from the Bedouin population of Jordan.

The cuisine of the Gaza Strip is influenced both by neighboring Egypt and its location on the Mediterranean coast. The staple food for the majority of the inhabitants in the area is fish. Gaza has a major fishing industry and fish is often served either grilled or fried after being stuffed with cilantro, garlic, red peppers, cumin, and then marinated in a mix of coriander, red peppers, cumin, and chopped lemons. The Egyptian culinary influence is also seen by the frequent use of hot peppers, garlic and chard to flavor many of Gaza's meals. A dish native to the Gaza area is Sumaghiyyeh, which consists of water-soaked ground sumac mixed with tahina, which is then added to sliced chard, pieces of stewed beef, and garbanzo beans.

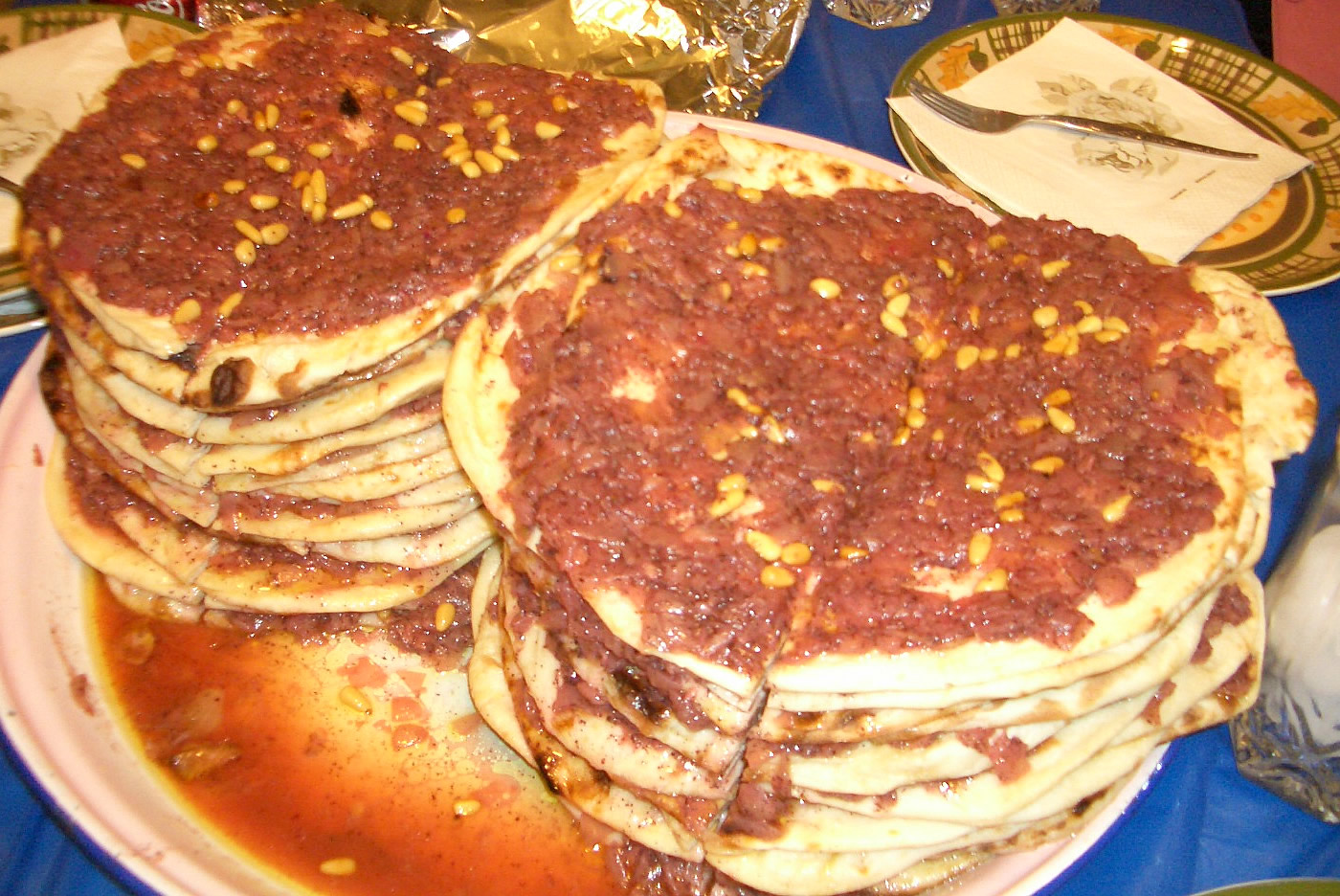
Musakhan, the national dish of Palestine

There are several foods native to Palestine that are well known in the Arab world, such as, Kinafe Nabulsi, Nabulsi cheese (cheese of Nablus), Ackawi cheese (cheese of Acre), Rumaniyya (from Jaffa), Sumaghiyyeh (a stew from Gaza) and Musakhan. Kinafe originated in Nablus, as well as the sweetened Nabulsi cheese used to fill it. Baqlawa, a pastry introduced at the time of the Ottoman Sultan Suleiman the Magnificent, is also an integral part of Palestinian cuisine.

Chick-pea based falafel, which substituted for the fava beans used in the original Egyptian recipe, and added Indian peppers, introduced after the Mongol invasions opened new trade routes, are a favorite staple in Mediterranean cuisine.

Entrées that are eaten throughout the Palestinian Territories include waraq al-'inib, boiled grape leaves wrapped around cooked rice and ground lamb. Mahashi is an assortment of stuffed vegetables such as zucchinis, potatoes, cabbage and, in Gaza, chard.

== Film ==
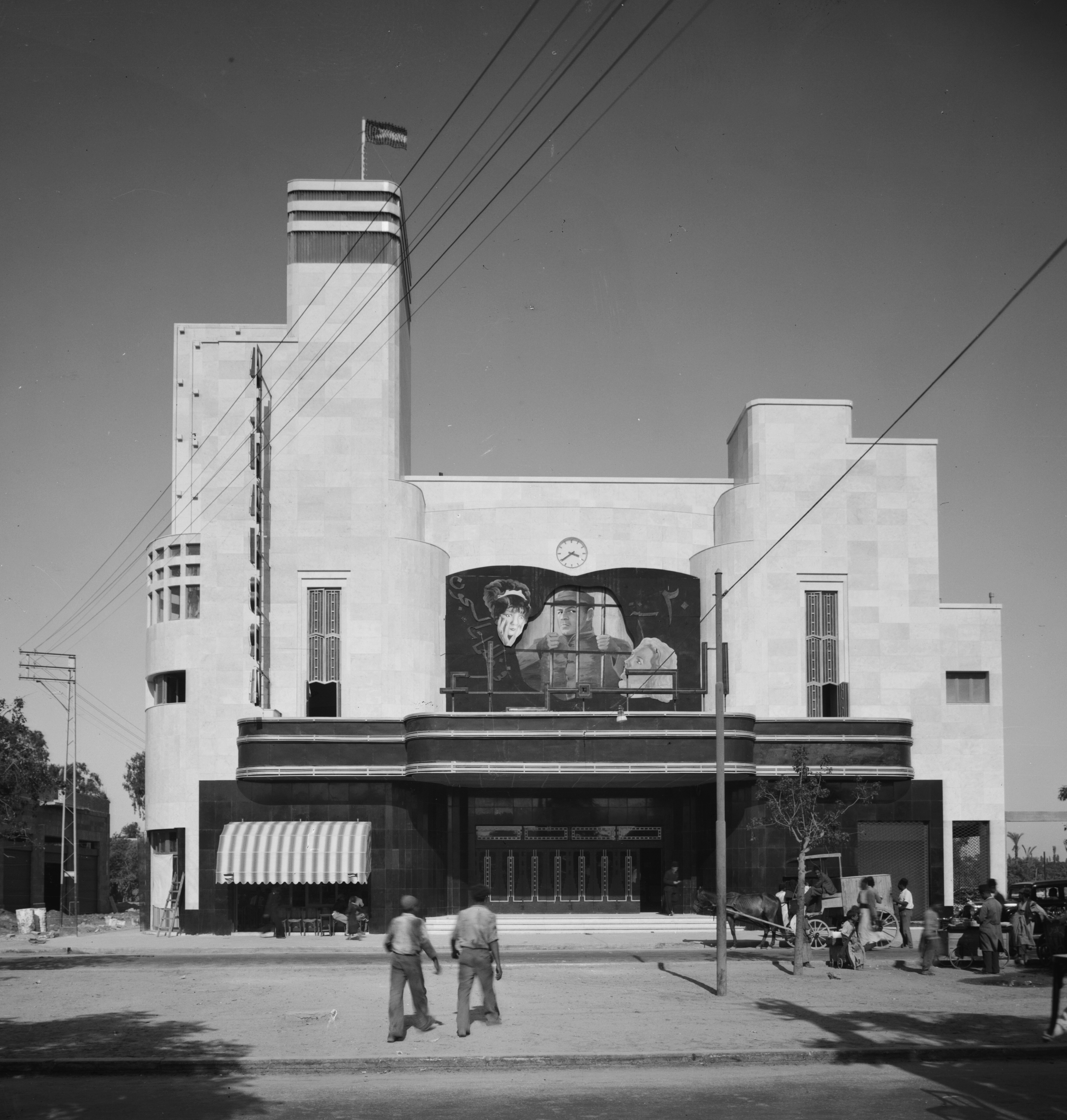
The Alhambra Cinema in Jaffa, 1937, bombed December 1947

Palestinian cinema is relatively young compared to Arab cinema overall and many Palestinian movies are made with European and Israeli support. Palestinian films are not exclusively produced in Arabic; some are made in English, French or Hebrew. More than 800 films have been produced about Palestinians, the Israeli–Palestinian conflict, and other related topics; notable examples are Divine Intervention and Paradise Now.

== Handicrafts ==
A wide variety of handicrafts, many of which have been produced by Palestinians for hundreds of years, continue to be produced today. Palestinian handicrafts include embroidery and weaving, pottery-making, soap-making, glass-making, and olive wood and Mother of Pearl carvings.

In 2021 and 2022 respectively, joint nominations made by Palestine and other Arab States were inscribed to UNESCO's list of intangible cultural heritage for the knowledge and use of the date palm, and Arabic calligraphy.

== Intellectuals ==
In the late 19th century and early 20th century, Palestinian intellectuals were integral parts of wider Arab intellectual circles, as represented by individuals such as May Ziadeh and Khalil Beidas. Educational levels among Palestinians have traditionally been high. In the 1960s, the West Bank had a higher percentage of its adolescent (15 to 17 years of age) population enrolled in high school than Israel; the West Bank had a 44.6% high school enrollment rate versus a 22.8% enrollment rate in Israel. Claude Cheysson, France's Minister for Foreign Affairs under the first Mitterrand Presidency, held in the mid eighties that "even thirty years ago, [Palestinians] probably already had the largest educated elite of all the Arab peoples."

Diaspora figures like Edward Said and Ghada Karmi, Arab citizens of Israel like Emile Habibi, and Jordanians like Ibrahim Nasrallah have made contributions to a wide number of fields, exemplifying the diversity of experience and thought among Palestinians.

== Literature ==
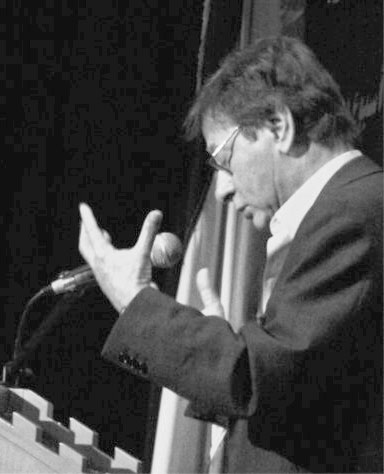
Mahmoud Darwish, a Palestinian poet

The long history of the Arabic language and its rich written and oral tradition form part of the Palestinian literary tradition as it has developed over the course of the 20th and 21st centuries.

Since 1967, most critics have theorized the existence of three "branches" of Palestinian literature, loosely divided by geographic location: 1) from inside Israel, 2) from the occupied territories, 3) from among the Palestinian diaspora throughout the Middle East.

== Modern poetry ==
Poetry, using classical pre-Islamic forms, remains an extremely popular art form, often attracting Palestinian audiences in the thousands. Until 20 years ago, local folk bards reciting traditional verses were a feature of every Palestinian town. After the 1948 Palestinian exodus, poetry was transformed into a vehicle for political activism. From among those Palestinians who became Arab citizens of Israel after the passage of the Citizenship Law in 1952, a school of resistance poetry was born that included poets like Mahmoud Darwish, Samih al-Qasim, and Tawfiq Zayyad. The work of these poets was largely unknown to the wider Arab world for years because of the lack of diplomatic relations between Israel and Arab governments. This changed after Ghassan Kanafani, another Palestinian writer in exile in Lebanon, published an anthology of their work in 1966. Palestinian poets often write about a sense of loss and existence in the diaspora.

== Modern music ==
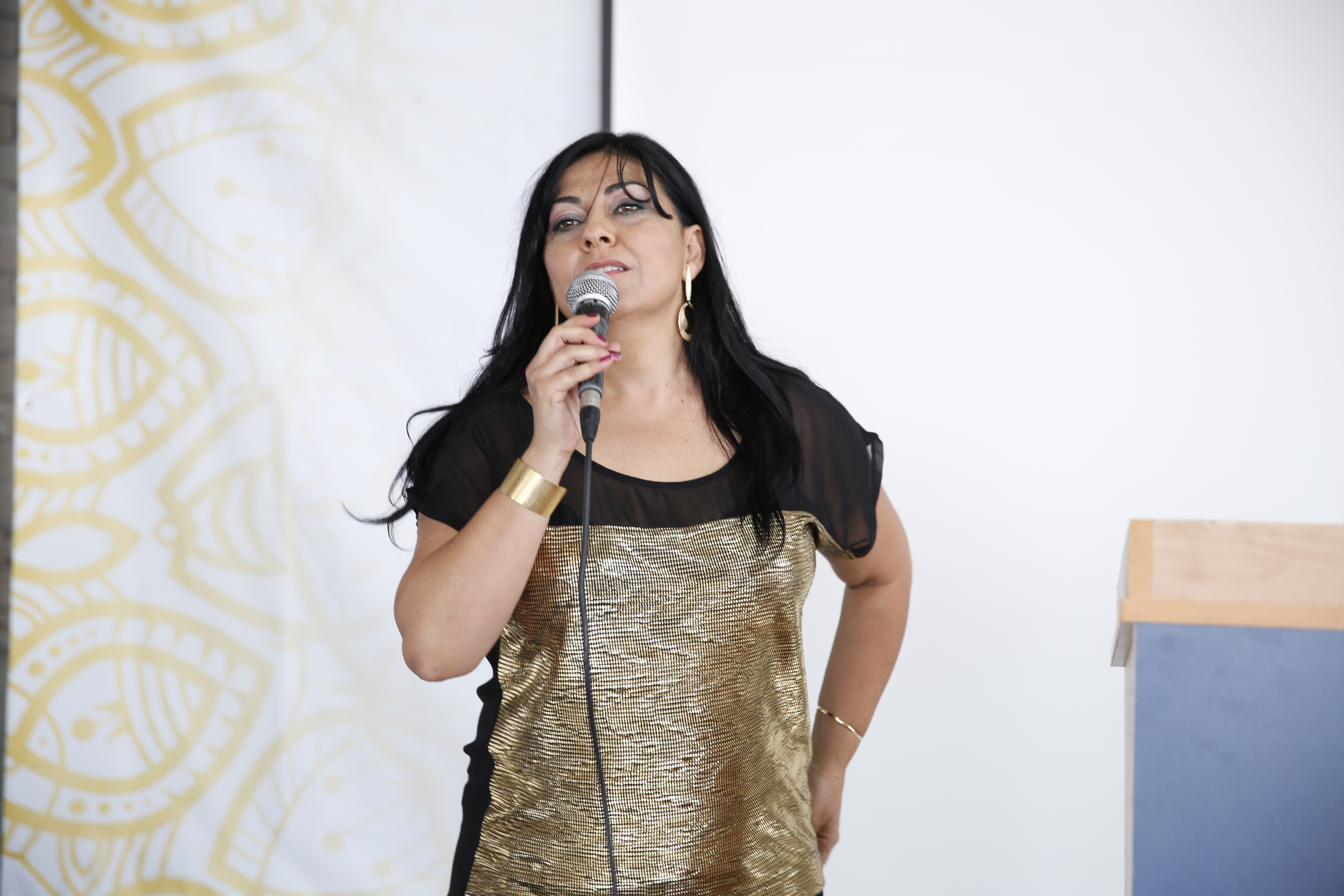
Amal Murkus performing in 2015

Palestinian music is well known throughout the Arab world. It reflects the Palestinian experience, primarily dealing with the struggle with Israel. A new wave of performers emerged with distinctively Palestinian themes following the 1948 Palestinian expulsion and flight, relating to the dreams of statehood and the burgeoning nationalist sentiments.

Since the 1990s the subgenre of Palestinian hip hop has blended the traditional folk music elements of Palestinian music and Arabic melodies with hip hop beats. These artists see themselves as joining a “longer tradition of revolutionary, underground, Arabic music and political songs that have supported Palestinian Resistance”, "[tailoring] the style to express their own grievances with the social and political climate in which they live and work".

Modern Palestinian singers include Mohammed Assaf, Yacoub Shaheen, Toni Qattan, Saint Levant and Elyanna.

== See also ==
- Arab citizens of Israel § Culture
- List of national symbols of Palestine
