= Palestinian Family Planning and Protection Association =

The Palestinian Family Planning and Protection Association is a Palestinian sexual and reproductive health NGO, founded in Jerusalem in 1964. The PFPPA is affiliated with the International Planned Parenthood Federation. In 2014 it provided services to more than 70,000 women. In 2019 it had eight clinics in the West Bank and Gaza Strip. It also provides services through telemedicine.

Abortion is largely illegal in Palestine. The PFPPA does not provide abortion care at its clinics, but does provide referrals to doctors who are willing to do so. The PFPPA supports "the right of women to choose the number and time of safe pregnancies as well as a safe abortion for medical reasons." The group describes itself as taking a harm reduction approach to abortion care.

The PFPPA's clinic in Gaza was destroyed by an Israeli airstrike in October 2023. Thabat Salim, a doctor employed by the group, was killed in another airstrike (in the Nuseirat refugee camp) in January 2025.
