= Abortion in Israel =

Abortion in Israel is permitted when determined by a termination committee, with the vast majority of cases being approved, as of 2019. The rate of abortion in Israel has steadily declined since 1988, and compared to the rest of the world, abortion rates in Israel are moderate. According to government data, in Israel, abortion rates in 2016 dropped steadily to 9 per 1,000 women of childbearing age, lower than England (16.2) and the United States (13.2). 99% of abortions are carried out in the first trimester. Despite allegations of permitting abortion under limited circumstances, Haaretz noted in 2019 that this is not the case, and abortion is almost always permitted in Israel.

Abortion in Israel had been illegal, but became legal, subject to a termination committee's approval, under the penal code of 1977.

Prior to 2014, approval for an abortion in Israel by a termination committee was given under limited circumstances, such as if the woman was unmarried, age considerations (if the woman was under the age of 18 – the legal marriage age in Israel – or over the age of 40), the pregnancy was conceived under illegal circumstances (rape, statutory rape, etc.) or an incestuous relationship, birth defects, or risk to the life or health of the mother. Subsequent to 2014, abortion up to the age of 33 can be provided for under the nationally funded health basket.

According to the Israel Central Bureau of Statistics report from 2004, in 2003, most abortion requests were granted, with 19,500 legal abortions performed and 200 requests for abortion denied. Reasons for termination went as follows: The woman was unmarried (42%), illegal circumstances (11%), health risks to the woman (about 20%), age of the woman (11%), and fetal birth defects (about 17%). Women who would not qualify for an abortion under the statutory scheme may seek an abortion at a private clinic, although abortion in a private clinic is illegal.

It was reported in 2012 that about half of all abortions in Israel were performed in private clinics, i. e., without committee approval. Women who undergo such an abortion do not face criminal penalties, but physicians who perform them face a fine, or up to five years' imprisonment; however, there have been no known prosecutions of physicians for performing non-committee-approved abortions. About 20,000 abortions take place in Israel every year, with the figure remaining steady, despite a substantial increase in the population.

== Legal position ==
Clauses 312-321 of the 1977 penal code limit the circumstances when an abortion is legal in Israel. Abortions must be approved by a termination committee. Abortions can only be performed by licensed gynecologists in recognized medical facilities that are specifically and publicly recognized as a provider of abortions. However, the Israeli Cabinet updated the 1977 law in 2014 to allow abortion to be provided for nearly every woman in the country seeking an elective abortion.

=== Circumstances under which abortion is approved ===
Under a 1977 abortion law, a termination committee can approve an abortion, under sub-section 316a, in the following circumstances:

1. The woman is younger than the legal marriage age in Israel (which now is 18, raised from 17 in April 2013), or older than forty. (This was later amended to also include women under the age of twenty.)
2. The pregnancy was conceived under illegal circumstances (rape, statutory rape, etc.), in an incestuous relationship, or outside of marriage.
3. The fetus may have a physical or mental birth defect.
4. Continued pregnancy may put the woman's life in risk, or damage her physically or mentally.

Previously, cases where the woman is between the ages of 20–33, and/or was granted an abortion due to the baby having been conceived under illegal circumstances or incest, the fetus had a serious physical or mental defect, the mother was unmarried, or the mother's health was in danger, the state pays for the abortion. However, the law was modified in 2014 to allow a free state-funded "health basket" for any woman seeking an abortion. Women who get pregnant while serving in the IDF are entitled to free, state-funded abortion.

In practice, most requests for abortion that qualify for the above are granted, and leniency is shown especially under the clause for emotional or psychological damage to the pregnant woman. The committees approve 98% of requests.

In 2022, new regulations went into effect stating that those seeking abortions could send their requests online, and would no longer be asked about their use of birth control. As well, under the new regulations, they no longer have to meet with a social worker, and may obtain a medication abortion (if medically possible) under the oversight of a community health clinic, rather than having to go to hospitals to receive the medication, as they did previously.

=== Structure of the committee ===
There are 38 termination committees operating in public or private hospitals across Israel. These committees consist of three members, two of which are licensed physicians, and one a social worker. Of the two physicians, one must be a specialist in obstetrics and gynaecology, and the other one either OB/GYN, internal medicine, psychiatry, family medicine, or public health. At least one member must be a woman. Six separate committees consider abortion requests when the fetus is beyond 24 weeks old.

== Abortion debate in Israel ==
There is an abortion debate in Israel, although it is sidelined by more publicized and controversial issues. The debate as to the morality of abortion is antecedent to the debate about separation of religion and state in the context of Israel as a Jewish State and a democracy.

In 2024, Pew Research Center reported that 51% of Israeli adults believed that abortion should be legal in most or all cases, with 42% having the opposite opinion.

Orthodox Jewish organizations, including political parties, strongly oppose abortion on demand because most interpretations of Jewish law view abortion as prohibited, except for saving the mother's life or health. Political parties that champion this view include Shas, a Sephardic Haredi party; United Torah Judaism, an Ashkenazi Haredi party; and Religious Zionist Party, Noam, and Otzma Yehudit, three Religious Zionist parties. A study published in 2001 found that opposition to abortion among Israelis was correlated to strong religious beliefs, particularly Orthodox Jewish beliefs, below-average income, larger family size, and identification with right-wing politics.

Left-wing parties, such as Meretz, argue in favor of legalized abortion for reasons of personal liberty. In 2006, MK Zehava Gal-On of Meretz proposed a bill that would eliminate the termination committees, effectively decriminalizing unrestricted abortion. Gal-On argued that women with financial means can have abortions in private clinics, bypassing the committee and, therefore, gaining rights based on their wealth. The bill was rejected by a wide margin.

When the relevant section of the penal code was originally written, it contained a "social clause" permitting women to seek abortions for social reasons, such as economic distress. The clause was withdrawn in 1980 under the initiative of the Orthodox Jewish parties (see Shas, United Torah Judaism, and National Religious Party).

This clause is still under debate in Israel. In 2004, MK Reshef Chen of Shinui submitted an addendum to reinstate the clause, arguing that under present circumstances, women with financial problems must lie to the termination committee to obtain approval under the emotional or psychological damage clause, and that "no advanced country compels its citizens to lie in order to preserve religious, chauvinistic, patronizing archaic values". Women's organizations such as Naamat supported the proposal.

Women's organizations such as Naamat and Shdulat HaNashim (women's lobby) argue in favor for feminist, pro-choice reasons, such as reproductive rights.

Efrat is a religious organization that lobbies against abortions, as well as offering financial support to women who are considering abortion for economic reasons. Efrat's campaign includes stickers with the slogan, "Don't abort me" (Hebrew: אל תפילו אותי). Be'ad Chaim (Pro-Life) is a Messianic Christian anti-abortion non-profit association. Another organization which provides financial support and counseling to women considering abortion is "Just One Life" (J.O.L.) – which in Hebrew is known as Nefesh Achat B'Yisrael.

== See also ==
- Judaism and abortion
