= Özkan =

Özkan is a common Turkish name. Notable people with the name include:

== Given name ==
- Özkan Baltacı (born 1994), Turkish hammer thrower
- Ozkan Cetiner (born 2000), French footballer
- Özkan Hayırlı (born 1984), Turkish volleyball player
- Özkan Karabulut (born 1991), Turkish footballer
- Özkan Koçtürk (born 1974), Turkish-German footballer
- Özkan Manav (born 1967), Turkish composer
- Özkan Murat (born 1957), Turkish Cypriot politician
- Özkan Sümer (1940–2020), Turkish footballer
- Özkan Uğur (1953–2023), Turkish pop musician
- Özkan Yiğiter (born 2000), Turkish footballer
- Özkan Zengin (born 1982), Turkish serial killer

== Surname ==
- Aleyna Özkan (born 2002), Turkish swimmer
- Âşık Ali İzzet Özkan (1902–1981), Turkish musician and poet
- Aygül Özkan (born 1971), German politician of Turkish origin
- Aysel Özkan (born 2002), Turkish female weightlifter
- Burcu Çelik Özkan (born 1986), Turkish politician
- Cahit Özkan (born 1976), Turkish politician
- Can Özkan (born 1999), German footballer
- Cansel Özkan (born 2003), Turkish female weightlifter
- Ebru Özkan (born 1978), Turkish actress
- Emre Özkan (born 1988), Turkish footballer
- Eriş Özkan (born 1981), Turkish footballer
- Ertan Özkan (born 1996), Turkish sprinter
- Ertuğrul Özkan (born 1942), Turkish sailor
- Esra Özkan (born 1996), Turkish women's footballer
- Gabriel Özkan (born 1986), Swedish football player of Assyrian/Syriac descent
- Gizem Özkan (born 2002), Turkish female archer
- Gülsel Özkan (born 1966), German director and screenwriter
- Hasan Özkan (born 1997), Turkish footballer
- Hüsamettin Özkan (born 1950), Turkish politician
- Hüseyin Özkan (born 1972), Turkish judoka
- Kerem Özkan (born 1988), Turkish basketball player
- Mustafa Özkan (born 1975), Turkish footballer
- Necati Özkan (born 1960), Turkish political consultant
- Ömer Özkan (born 1971), Turkish plastic surgeon
- Ozan Özkan (born 1984), Turkish footballer
- Saadet Özkan (born 1978), Turkish activist
- Şakir Özkan Torunlar (born 1960), Turkish diplomat
- Serdar Özkan (born 1987), Turkish footballer
- Sibel Özkan (born 1988), Turkish female weightlifter
- Sinan Özkan (born 1986), Turkish football player
- Sinem Özkan (born 2002), Turkish karateka
- Sudi Özkan, Turkish businessman
- Tuba Özkan-Haller, Turkish-American earth scientist
- Tuncay Özkan (born 1966), Turkish politician
- Ümit Özkan, Turkish-American chemical engineer
- Yavuz Özkan (director) (born 1942), Turkish film director
- Yavuz Özkan (footballer) (born 1985), Turkish coach and former footballer

== See also ==
- Mazhar-Fuat-Özkan, Turkish band
- Özkan, Emirdağ, a village in Emirdağ district of Afyonkarahisar Province, Turkey
- Özcan
