= Özcan =

Özcan (pronounced [œzdʒan]) is a Turkish male given name which also appears as a surname. Notable people with the name include:

== Given name ==
- Özcan Alper, Turkish director and screenwriter
- Özcan Arkoç, Turkish footballer
- Özcan Bizati, Turkish football manager
- Özcan Deniz, Turkish actor and musician
- Özcan Kızıltan, Turkish footballer
- Özcan Köksoy, Turkish footballer
- Özcan Melkemichel, Swedish football manager
- Özcan Mutlu, Turkish-German politician
- Özcan Özel, Turkish politician
- Özgür Can Özcan, Turkish footballer
- Özcan Seçmen, Turkish botanist
- Özcan Purçu, Turkish politician of Romani heritage
- Özcan Yaşar, Turkish footballer
- Özcan Yeniçeri, Turkish politician and academic
- Özcan Yorgancıoğlu, Turkish Cypriot politician

== Surname ==
- Ahmet Özcan, Swiss footballer
- Ali Can Özcan, Turkish paralympic taekwondo player
- Ali Kemal Özcan, Turkish academic
- Berkay Özcan, Turkish-German footballer
- Fatma Özcan, Turkish-American computer scientist
- Gazanfer Özcan, Turkish actor
- Kadir Özcan, Turkish footballer
- Kaya Özcan, Turkish wrestler
- Macit Özcan, Turkish politician
- Mustafa Özcan, Turkish long-distance runner
- Mustafa Özcan Güneşdoğdu, Turkish Quran reciter
- Muzzi Özcan, British Turk football agent
- Naşit Özcan, Turkish actor
- Özgürcan Özcan, Turkish footballer
- Rahmi Özcan (born 1990), Turkish amputee footballer
- Ramazan Özcan, Austrian footballer
- Reha Özcan, Turkish actor
- Salih Özcan, German footballer
- Sebnem Kalemli-Ozcan, Turkish economist
- Serden Özcan, Danish academic
- Şeref Özcan, German footballer
- Sümeyye Özcan, Turkish female Paralympian athlete and goalball player
- Sümeyye Özcan, Liechtensteiner footballer
- Tayfun Özcan, Dutch-Turkish kickboxer
- Ummet Ozcan, Dutch DJ of Turkish origin
- Yasin Özcan, Turkish footballer

== See also ==
- Özkan
