= Aşık =

Aşık is Turkish for Ashik, a traditional musician and troubadour

Aşık is a Turkish name. Notable people with the name include:

== Given name ==
- Aşık Çelebi (1520–1572), Ottoman biographer, poet, and translator
- Âşık İbretî (1920–1976), Turkish ashik, poet and folk singer
- Aşık Khanlar (1950–1998), Azerbaijani ashik
- Âşık Ali İzzet Özkan (1902–1981), Turkish minstrel
- Aşık Mahzuni Şerif (1939–2002), Turkish folk musician
- Âşık Veysel Şatıroğlu (1894–1973), Turkish minstrel and poet
- Aşik Sümmani (1861–1915), Turkish ashik

== Surname ==
- Ašik-paša Zade (1400–1484), Ottoman historian
- Elif Beyza Aşık (born 1994), Turkish sports shooter
- Emre Aşık (born 1973), Turkish footballer
- Eyüp Aşık (born 1953), Turkish politician
- Ömer Aşık (born 1986), Turkish basketball player
- Ömer Aşık (archer) (born 1991), Turkish Paralympian archer

== See also ==
- Asik (disambiguation)
