= Driller killer =

Driller killer may refer to:

== Film ==
- The Driller Killer, 1979 horror film
- "Driller Killer", the nickname for Russ Thorn, the villain in The Slumber Party Massacre series
- "Driller Killer", the name sometimes used for the killer from 1984 film Body Double

== Music ==
- Driller Killer (band), a Swedish punk band
- "Driller Killer" (song), a 1995 song by Mortician, off the album House by the Cemetery (EP)
- "Driller Killer" (song), a 1992 song by Nekromantix, off the album Brought Back to Life
- "The Driller Killer" (song), a 2006 song by Angerfist, off the album Pissin' Razorbladez

== See also ==
- Özkan Zengin (born 1982) Turkish serial killer nicknamed the "Well Driller Killer"
- Driller (disambiguation)
- Killer (disambiguation)
