= Bangladesh–Turkey relations =

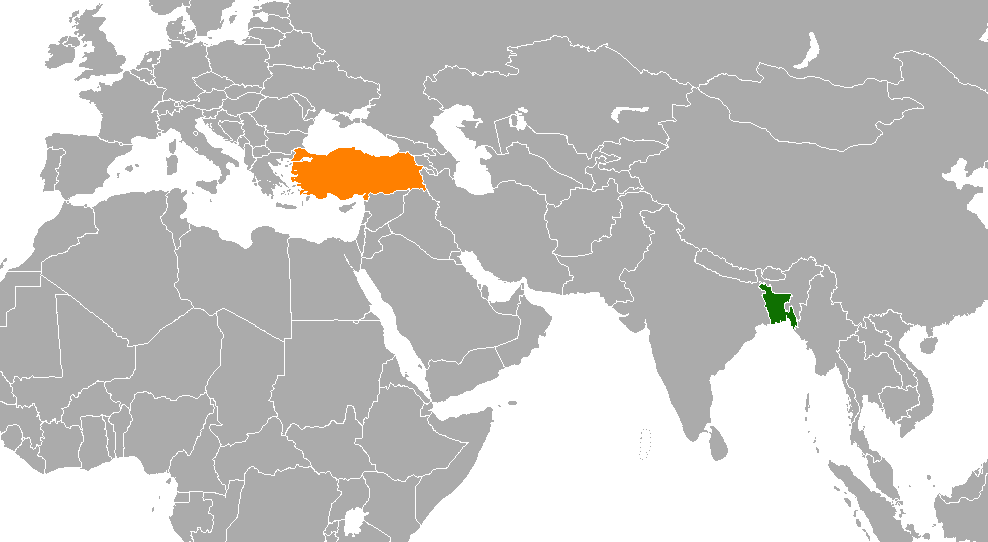

- Turkey: Bangladesh

Diplomatic mission
- Turkish embassy, Dhaka: Bangladeshi embassy, Ankara

Bangladesh–Turkey relations are the bilateral relations between Bangladesh and Turkey. Both countries are members of the Organisation of Islamic Cooperation. Turkey has an embassy in Dhaka, and Bangladesh has one in Ankara and a consulate in Istanbul.

== History ==
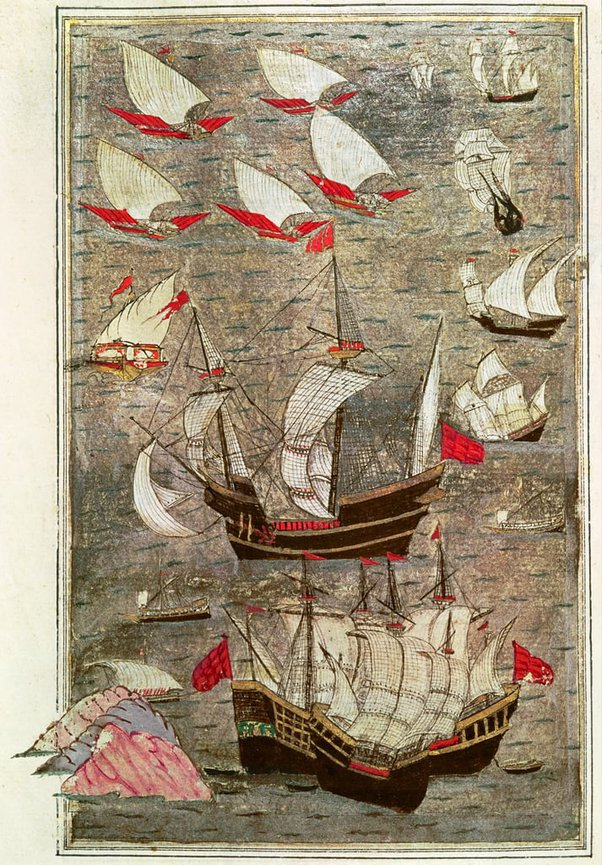
An Ottoman fleet in the 16th century, not far from the Port of Chittagong.

=== Early ===
The two nations have had diplomatic relationships for several centuries. Ottoman ports were establishing trade links with Bengal by the 1580s. The ancient shipbuilding industry at the Port of Chittagong provided for the entire fleet of Ottoman warships of the sultans in the 17th century. The renowned muslin trade in Bengal was also welcomed by the Ottomans, who used the material for their turbans.

Mukhtar Ahmed Ansari's All-India Medical Mission travelled to Constantinople in 1912 to provide medical aid to the Ottoman Empire during the Balkan Wars. One notable participant in the mission was the Bengali author Ismail Hossain Siraji. Bengali Muslims continued to express their support for the Ottomans during the Khilafat Movement.

=== Modern ===
In 2016, the diplomatic relationship between the two countries became complex when Bangladesh denounced Turkey's consecutive requests to free several Bangladeshi Jamaat-e-Islami leaders who had been convicted of war crimes during the Bangladesh Liberation War by a domestic tribunal in Bangladesh, which was oddly named the International Crimes Tribunal, and were eventually executed. Following the execution of the Jamaat leader Motiur Rahman Nizami, Turkey withdrew its ambassador to Bangladesh. However, after Bangladesh's condemnation of the coup d'état attempt to overthrow the Erdogan government, relations began to improve. Consequently, Ankara sent a new ambassador to Dhaka. After arrival, the new Turkish ambassador remarked, "Bangladesh had helped Turkey by expressing its support to Erdogan's government after the failed coup attempt." The ambassador commented that the relations between the two countries have become normal. The ambassador also expressed Turkey's willingness to help Bangladesh to control militancy in the country.

During the Rohingya crisis, where the Muslim Rohingyas were being expelled from Myanmar, Turkey donated millions of dollars to the government of Bangladesh in order to aid the Rohingyas who are settling in Chittagong. In September 2017, First Lady Emine Erdogan visited and helped provide relief in the shelters of the Rohingyas and promised more co-operation and aid to Bangladesh.

=== Contribution to Turkish independence ===
People from what is now Bangladesh sent support for the Turkish War of Independence. Turkey remembers the aid received from South Asian Muslims, including Bengalis.

In 1921, National Poet of Bangladesh Kazi Nazrul Islam wrote a poem "Kemal Pasha" to praise Mustafa Kemal Atatürk. He was the only foreign poet to praise Atatürk and the Turkish War of Independence with a heroic poem.

== High level state visits ==
Former Bangladeshi president Ziaur Rahman became the first Bangladeshi head of state to visit Ankara. In 1986, the then Turkish prime minister, Turgut Ozal paid a visit to Bangladesh. Turkish President Suleyman Demirel joined Nelson Mandela and Yasser Arafat at the silver jubilee celebrations of Bangladesh's independence in 1997. In 1998, the two countries co-founded the Developing 8 Countries group. Turkish president Abdullah Gul paid an official visit to Dhaka in 2010. Turkish Prime Minister Recep Tayyip Erdoğan paid a visit to Dhaka in 2010. Bangladeshi Prime Minister Sheikh Hasina paid an official visit to Ankara in 2012.

== Defence cooperation ==
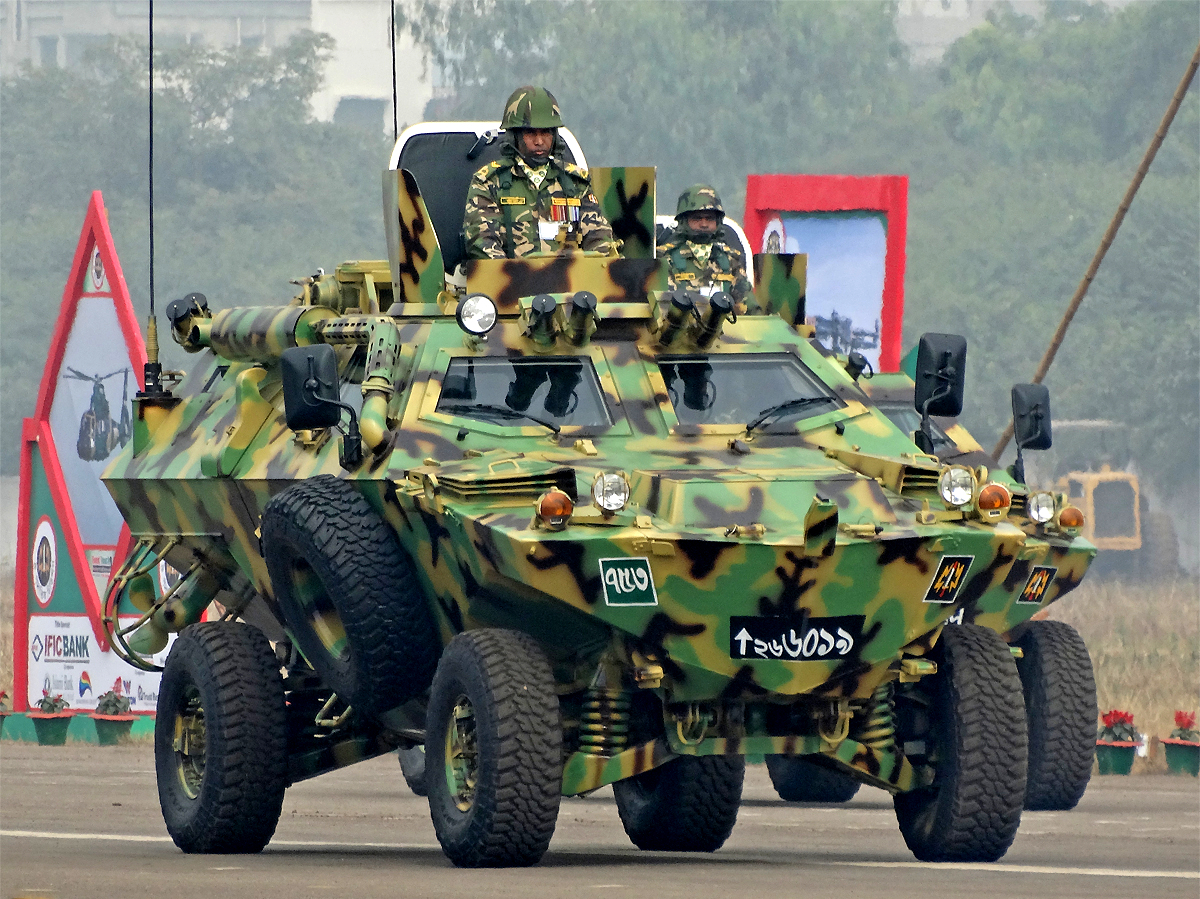
Turkish made Otokar Cobra of Bangladesh Army

In 2013, Turkey supplied Otokar Cobra light armored vehicles to the Bangladesh Army.

In June 2021, a turnkey 105 mm and 155 mm artillery shell production line establishment agreement was signed between Bangladesh and Turkish company REPKON. According to Uğur Cem Gürpınar, REPKON business development and corporate communications officer, "Bangladesh, like many friendly and allied countries, preferred REPKON because of its technology that is ahead of its competitors in the world".

On 29 June 2021, a government to government (G2G) defence memorandum of understanding (MoU) was signed between Bangladesh and Turkey. According to İsmail Demir, president of Presidency of Defense Industries, the export agreement of various products of Roketsan has been signed with Bangladesh. Roketsan already delivered TRG-300 Tiger MLRS to the Bangladesh Army in June 2021 from a separate deal.

In January 2025, Bangladesh and Türkiye explored avenues for enhanced cooperation in the defence industry and other key sectors.

In May-June 2025, Bangladesh Investment Development Authority (BIDA) announced plans to establish defence industrial zones in Chittagong and Narayanganj in collaboration with Turkish firms. During a visit to Turkey, BIDA Chairman Ashik Chowdhury held discussions with officials and toured MKE facilities. Bangladesh previously acquired MKE Boran howitzers and Bayraktar drones, with ongoing talks to procure advanced rocket systems and armoured vehicles, signalling growing bilateral defence cooperation.

== Economic relations ==
Bangladesh and Turkey are among each other's key trading partners. The bilateral trade between the two countries is worth more than $1 billion. Bangladeshi export items to Turkey have been dominated by apparel products. Since 2012, Bangladesh and Turkey have been in talks to sign a free trade agreement, but signing of the agreement is halted due to the complications relating to Turkey's bid for accession to the European Union. The shipbuilding industry of Bangladesh has also been identified as a potential sector for Turkish investment.

Bangladesh and Turkey signed a joint protocol on trade and investment in 2012. The Bangladesh-Turkey Joint Economic Commission has been holding biennial meetings to discuss the ways for increasing bilateral trade and investment.

== See also ==
- Bangladesh–Turkey defence cooperation
- List of ambassadors of Turkey to Bangladesh
