= Mardan Musayev =

Azerbaijani Red Army senior sergeant (1907–1982)

Mardan Mammad oglu Musayev
- Mərdan Məmməd oğlu Musayev
- Born: 1 January 1907; Əlimərdanlı, Russian Empire
- Died: 25 March 1982 (aged 75); Tovuz Rayon, Azerbaijan SSR, Soviet Union
- Military career
- Allegiance: Soviet Union
- Branch: Red Army
- Service years: 1941–45
- Rank: Senior Sergeant
- Unit: 5th Guards Mechanized Brigade
- Conflicts: World War II; Battle of the Caucasus; Dnieper-Carpathian Offensive
- Awards: Hero of the Soviet Union

Mardan Mammad oglu Musayev (Azerbaijani: Mərdan Məmməd oğlu Musayev; 1 January 1907 – 25 March 1982) was an Azerbaijani Red Army senior sergeant and a Hero of the Soviet Union. Musayev was awarded the title for his actions in the Dnieper–Carpathian Offensive, in which he fought in the capture of Beryslav. He reportedly killed a German machine-gun crew during the crossing of the Dnieper and days later saved the life of his company commander during the crossing of the Inhulets. During the subsequent capture of the Shevchenko State Farm Musayev captured another machine gun, reportedly killing 20 German soldiers. For these actions he received the title Hero of the Soviet Union on 3 June 1944. Postwar, he worked in the Tovuz Rayon market.

== Early life ==
Musayev was born on 1 January 1907 in the village of Əlimərdanlı in what is now Tovuz Rayon to a peasant family. In 1936, he graduated from the Geokchai Agricultural College and worked as a foreman in the Tovuz Machine and tractor station.

== World War II ==
Musayev was drafted into the Red Army in 1941. He fought in the defense of the North Caucasus and in battles on the Volga. He was wounded, but after recovery returned to the front. Musayev joined the Communist Party of the Soviet Union in 1942. During the battle for the Ukrainian village of Lepekhino fire from Musayev's heavy machine gun reportedly destroyed six machine guns and killed two German snipers. For his actions Musayev received the Order of Glory 3rd class.

By March 1944 Musaev led a squad of the motorized infantry battalion in the 5th Guards Mechanized Brigade, part of the 2nd Guards Mechanized Corps. He fought in the Bereznegovatoye-Snigirevka Offensive, part of the Dnieper-Carpathian Offensive. On the night of 10 March during the battle for Beryslav, a group of soldiers were given the task to cross the Dnieper and conduct reconnaissance. Musayev crossed to the right bank and under heavy small-arms and mortar fire, he reportedly attacked the German trenches and destroyed a machine gun, killing the crew and eight other German soldiers. On 13 March during the crossing of the Inhulets, in an action against a German infantry battalion, his company commander came under fire. Musayev defended his commander and reportedly killed a German officer and seven soldiers. During the later capture of the Shevchenko State Farm, heavy machine gun fire prevented the advance of the company. Musayev advanced and despite being wounded did not leave the battlefield. He shot the crew of the gun and captured it, reportedly killing 20 German soldiers. For his actions Musayev was awarded the title Hero of the Soviet Union and the Order of Lenin on 3 June 1944.

== Postwar ==
Postwar, Musayev was demobilized. He returned to Tovuz Rayon and worked in the local market. He died on 25 March 1982.
