= Ali Kemal Özcan =

Turkish academic

Ali Kemal Özcan (born 1959) is a Turkish academic and lecturer at the Munzur University in Tunceli. He is known for his research regarding the Kurdistan Workers' Party (PKK) and its leader Abdullah Öcalan.

== Education and early life ==
Özcan was born on the 20 May 1959 in the Kardere village of Tunceli province in 1959. He attended high school in Elazig, from where he graduated in 1976. He enrolled in to the Faculty of communications of the Marmara University where he obtained a B.Sc in 1982. In 1995 he began to study political philosophy at the University of Kent from where he obtained a M.Sc in 1997 during which he went and stayed in Damascus for one month (July 1996), and interviewed Abdullah Ocalan in length. And he followed his doctorate study in the same university where he accomplished a Ph.D in sociology in 2003 He followed up on his studies at the University of Munzur (Tunceli/Dersim) in 2010 where he obtained a position –the head of sociology department.

=== Research on the PKK ===
He interviewed Öcalan in Syria in 1996, while he was conducting research for his university studies. He attempted at joining the PKK activities in the United Kingdom but not admitted. His findings were included in his masters and doctoral papers.

== Professional career ==
He began to lecture at the Munzur University in 2010, where he was active in several positions most notably as the head of the Department of Sociology, which he remains. Besides, he has authored several books concerning the PKK.

=== On the Kurdish issue ===
He was involved in the parliamentary discussion on the peace process between the PKK and Turkey in 2013 and met Öcalan twice in Imrali prison, before the mayoral elections of Istanbul in June 2019 following which he read out a letter in which Öcalan shall have recommended the HDP to remain neutral during the elections. He is supportive of Abdullah Öcalans role in the peace process but critical of the one of Selahattin Demirtaş, the leader of the Peoples Democratic Party (HDP) at the time of the peace process.
