= Özkan Manav =

Turkish composer (born 1967)

- Born: Ali Özkan Manav; May 20, 1967 (age 59); Mersin, Turkey
- Occupation: Turkish composer of contemporary classical music

Ali Özkan Manav (born May 20, 1967) is a Turkish contemporary classical composer, educator, and music theorist. He is known for integrating Turkish modal traditions with contemporary Western compositional practices.

His music combines microtonality, spectral color, aleatoric textures, and formal complexity with references to Turkish folk and maqamic traditions. Since 1991, he has taught composition at Mimar Sinan Fine Arts University.

His works have been performed by internationally recognized ensembles and orchestras, and his contribution to Turkish contemporary music has earned both national and international distinction.

== Early life and education ==
Özkan Manav was born in Mersin on 20 May 1967. His family moved to Istanbul in 1971, where he spent most of his childhood and formative years. His first formal encounter with music came through his mother, who was a ballet dancer before her marriage. Between 1980 and 1985 he studied piano privately with Hülya Saydam, during which time he began experimenting with composition.

In 1984 he entered the State Conservatory of Mimar Sinan University, where he studied harmony and counterpoint with Erçivan Saydam, composition and modal theory with Ahmed Adnan Saygun, and aesthetics with philosopher Afşar Timuçin. After graduating in 1991, he continued advanced studies with İlhan Usmanbaş, completing his master's degree in 1994.

Between 1996 and 1999, Manav pursued doctoral studies at Boston University, studying composition with Lukas Foss and Marjorie Merryman.

== Academic career ==
Immediately after graduating in 1991, Manav joined the faculty of Mimar Sinan Fine Arts University State Conservatory, where he has taught solfege and instrumentation, then composition, counterpoint and fugue continuously. Over more than three decades, he has mentored many Turkish composers who later gained prominence in both Turkish and international contemporary music circles.

Beyond composition pedagogy, he has also contributed to Turkish musicology through research and publication, most notably co-authoring Müzikte Alımlama (“Reception in Music”), a study examining musical perception and interpretation in contemporary aesthetics.

== Musical style ==
Manav's compositional language has evolved through several stylistic phases. His earliest works show the influence of Saygun's modal idiom, Usmanbaş's abstraction, and the textural complexity of György Ligeti. These compositions often feature dense contrapuntal layering, asymmetrical rhythmic structures, and controlled aleatoric passages.

Beginning in the early 2000s, his style became increasingly concerned with the integration of Turkish maqamic pitch structures and folk-derived ornamentation. Rather than quoting folk melodies directly, he transforms their intervallic and gestural logic into abstract formal systems. This approach is especially evident in works such as Portamento lento and Uzun Hava, which reinterpret traditional expressive gestures through modern chamber textures.

His more recent works reveal an intensified focus on timbral resonance, cultural memory, and structural simultaneity. These pieces often juxtapose Eastern and Western temporalities, creating highly nuanced acoustic spaces in which modal material and contemporary harmonic fields coexist.

== Musical works ==
Manav's catalogue includes orchestral, chamber, solo, and vocal works spanning more than four decades. Among his most notable orchestral compositions are Symposium (1991), Andante lugubre (1993), Sforzati (1997–98), Carian Diary (2001), Portamento lento (2002), Four Turkish Folk Songs (2010), Haydar Haydar (2015) and Plural (2020).

His chamber works include Sinfonietta (1989–90), Symphonic Dances (1999–2000), Reflections (2006), Countryside Landscapes: Winter (2007), and Uzun Hava (2011). Significant solo works include Partita for viola, Taqsim for clarinet, Pigeons for harp, and Horon! for violin.

His six-part piano cycle Movement (1994–2009) is considered one of his most substantial explorations of pianistic structure and timbral transformation.

== Awards and honors ==
Throughout his career, Manav has received numerous awards, including the Malloy Miller Memorial Composition Prize (1997), the BMW musica viva Composition Prize (1998), the Deutsche Welle Composition Prize (2002), the Sofia International Composition Competition First Prize (2010), and the Arioso Musica Domani International Composition Prize (2010).

In Turkey, he received the Donizetti Composer of the Year Award in 2011. In 2022 he was honored with the Istanbul Music Festival Honorary Award, recognizing his lifetime contribution to Turkish contemporary music, and the BESOM Composition Prize.

== Recent activities (2022–2026) ==
Since 2022, Manav has remained highly active both as composer and educator. In 2022 he received the Istanbul Music Festival Honorary Award in 2022.

In 2024 he completed Senza rallentando, a concertante work for darbuka part and orchestra, exploring sustained temporal tension and gradual transformation of modal harmonic fields.

In 2024 he completed Horonlar, a major composition based on Black Sea rhythmic structures, reinterpreted through polymetric orchestral textures. This work represents one of his clearest engagements with Anatolian dance materials in abstract instrumental form.

== Works ==
=== Orchestra ===
- Symposium (1991)
- Andante Lugubre (1993)
- Sforzati (1997–98)
- Carian Diary (2001)
- Portamento lento (2002)
- Four Turkish Folk Songs (2010)
- Haydar Haydar (2015)
- Plural (2020)
- Senza rallentando, for darbuka and orchestra (2023–24)
- Horonlar, string orchestra (2024)
- Myths of Time and the River, for saxophone quartet and orchestra (2026)

=== Chamber Ensemble ===
- Sinfonietta, wind instruments, timpani and xylophone (1989–90)
- Symphonic Dances, 7 percussionists (1999–2000)
- Reflections, piano and nine performers (2006)
- Countryside Landscapes: Winter, fourteen string instruments (2007)
- Uzun Hava, eight winds and two string instruments (2011)
- We talked, the sound of water in our palms (2019)

=== Chamber Music ===
- Artvin Dance, brass quintet (1991, rev. 2002)
- Sonata, violin and piano (1992)
- Poems with Music, six musicians and narrator (1995–96)
- Wanderings, two oboes, two clarinets and alto saxophone (1996−97, rev. 1998, 2004)
- Laçin, arrangement for piano trio (2003)
- Four Pieces for Five Clarinets (2003–04)
- Reflections, accordion and piano (2004–05)
- Three Turkish Folk Songs, violoncello and piano (2008–09)
- The Land of Beautiful Horses, string quartet (2010)
- String Quartet (2012)
- Five Anatolian Tunes, violin and piano (2013)
- Bilmem Şu Feleğin Bende Nesi Var, violin, viola and piano (2013)
- Topography of Shadow, flute and piano (2014)
- Shadows of Wind, flute and piano (2014)
- What the Earth Whispers, violin, violoncello and piano (2014)
- Ludus Modalis, violin, violoncello and piano (2016)
- Horon, double bass and piano (2016)
- Aman Avcı, double bass and piano (2016)
- iz, saxophone quartet (2022)
- Horonlar, string quartet (2024)
- Horonlar, string trio (2024)
- Horonlar, saxophone quartet (2024)
- Horon, two contrabass saxophones and piano (2025)

=== Solo Instrument ===
- Partita, viola (1991−92, rev. 2003)
- Face-to-Face with Saygun: Proliferations on Five Pieces from Modal Music, violin (2005)
- Taqsim, clarinet (2005)
- Pigeons, harp (2010)
- Horon!, violin (2011)
- Three Images, violin (2020)
- Acrostic, flute (2023)
- Two Etudes, percussion (2024)

=== Piano ===
- Movement 1 (1994)
- Movement 2 (1998)
- Movement 3 (2001)
- Movement 4 (2001)
- Movement 5 (2006)
- Movement 6 (2009)
- Nebulous Particles (2013)

=== Piano duet ===
Two Anatolian Tunes (2015–16)

=== Vocals and piano ===
Nazım Hikmet Songs, baritone and piano (1997–98)

=== Choir ===
- Spoon Dance Air (1990)
- Dök zülfünü meydâna gel, polyphonic arrangement (1991)
- Allam alam, polyphonic arrangement for choir and percussions (1994)
- Kız sen geldin Çerkeş’ten, polyphonic arrangement (2001)
- Onlar ki, eight-part choir (2018)
- Ali Onbaşı’nın Türküsü, eight-part choir (2018)
- Arkam Sensin Kalam Sensin Dağlar Hey (2018)
- I’m Listening to Istanbul, eight-part choir and two reciters (2022)

== Authored Work ==
Müzikte Alımlama (Reception in Music), Pan Yayıncılık, Istanbul, 2012. [with Mehmet Nemutlu]
