= Serden Özcan =

Danish academic (born 1977)

- Born: 1977
- Education: Copenhagen Business School, Denmark
- Title: Professor and Associate Dean, WHU – Otto Beisheim School of Management

Serden Özcan (born 1977) is a professor and holder of the Otto Beisheim Endowed Chair of Innovation and Corporate Transformation at the WHU – Otto Beisheim School of Management in Vallendar near Koblenz. During the 2017/2018 academic year the Chair of Innovation and Corporate Transformation moved from Vallendar to Düsseldorf.

== Life ==
He assumed the Otto Beisheim Endowed Chair of Innovation and Corporate Transformation in July 2014 where he is also a professor. In October 2017 he joined the WHU Board of Directors as the Academic Director of Executive Education. Under his leadership, WHU Executive Education qualified in 2018 for the Financial Times Executive Education Open Program rankings for the first time ever, achieving a ranking of 60. Özcan was Associate Dean for Corporate Communications and a member of WHU's Executive Committee at the WHU – Otto Beisheim School of Management at the WHU Düsseldorf campus in 2019/2020. In 2019 WHU ExecEd open programs ranked 45 overall in the FT Executive Education Open Program rankings and in 2020 WHU Executive Education Open Programs made it into the top 40 of the best executive education providers in the world (#39) according to the FT rankings. Since February 2020, he has been Academic Co-Director of the WHU/IESE High-Performance Board Member Program. Özcan teaches at the Kellogg-WHU Executive MBA and WHU MBA and WHU Executive Education. Ozcan is also the director of the Advanced Management Program and CIO Leadership Programs.

Prior to this, Özcan was an assistant professor (2007) and then associate professor (2009) at the Department of Innovation and Organizational Economics at the Copenhagen Business School, Denmark until 2014. During this time, he was also one of the two Academic Directors of the Entrepreneurship Platform, and a visiting researcher at the National University of Singapore NUS Business School in Singapore, Stanford University and Sabancı University Graduate School of Management.

Özcan received his PhD in Business Economics from the Copenhagen Business School in Copenhagen in February 2007. He received an MSc in International Management from the University of Southern Denmark in Odense, Denmark in September 2003.

== Research ==
The research focus of Özcan and his staff is on innovation, corporate transformation, including the emergence and diffusion of new business models and organizational forms, growth ecosystems, venture capital & private equity, evolution of firms, competitive strategy and strategic renewal. Özcan is the author of numerous publications in national and international journals including Organization Science, Management Science, Journal of Management Studies, Academy of Management Journal, Strategic Organization and Industry and Innovation. He receives regular media coverage on the subject of cross-border M&As, digitalisation, supervisory boards and start-ups. His coverage to date includes Bloomberg News, Washington Post, Chicago Tribune, CIO Magazine, along with international business and economics publications such as Handelsblatt, WirtschaftsWoche, Manager Magazin, Die Welt, Focus (German magazine) Online, ARD (broadcaster), Økonomist Ugebrevand and Gruenderszene.

Together with his colleague Professor Dr. Christophe Boone, Özcan was a recipient of a research grant by the Research Foundation – Flanders (FWO) for their research into Islamic banking.

== WHU Campus for Corporate Transformation ==
Özcan is the founder of the annual WHU Campus for Corporate Transformation conference.

== Journal articles ==
- M Feldman, S Özcan, T Reichstein 2020. Variation in Organizational Practices: Are Startups Really Different?, Journal of Evolutionary Economics, forthcoming.
- A Karaevli, S Özcan, A Wintermeyer 2020. The Four IT Competencies Every IT Workforce Needs, MIT Sloan Management Review, to be published in Winter 2021 edition.
- C Boone, S Özcan 2019. Oppositional logics and the antecedents of hybridization: A country-level study of the diffusion of Islamic banking windows, 1975–2017, Organization Science, published online April 1, 2020.
- Feldman, M., S Özcan, T Reichstein 2019. Falling not far from the tree: Entrepreneurs' prior employment and the transfer of organizational practices, Organization Science 30(2): 1047–7039.
- S Özcan, D Sassmannshausen 2018. The China Gambit: When Chinese VCs knock on a German start-up's door. The Case Center Reference No: 818-0019-1.
- C Boone, S Özcan 2016. The ideological purity vs. hybridization trade-off: When do Islamic banks hire managers from conventional banking, Organization Science, 27(6): 1380–1396.
- C Boone, S Özcan 2016. Strategic choices at entry and relative survival advantage of cooperatives vs. corporations in the US bio-ethanol industry, 1978–2015, Journal of Management Studies, 53(7): 1109–1255.
- C Boone, S Özcan 2014. Why do cooperatives emerge in a world dominated by corporations? The diffusion of cooperatives in the US bio-ethanol industry, 1978–2013, Academy of Management Journal, 57(4): 990–1012.
- Ö Koçak, S Özcan, 2013. How does rivals' presence affect firms' decision to enter new markets? Economic and sociological explanations, Management Science, 59(11): 2586–2603.
- S Özcan, T Reichstein, 2009. Transition to entrepreneurship from the public sector: Predispositional and contextual effects, Management Science, 55(4): 604–618.
- S Özcan; ML Overby (2008-10-29). "A cognitive model of stock market reactions to multi-firm alliance announcements". Strategic Organization. 6 (4): 435–469. doi:10.1177/1476127008096365.
- V Mahnke, S Özcan, ML Overby. 2006. Outsourcing innovative capabilities for IT‐enabled services, Industry and Innovation, 13(2): 189–207.

== Awards ==
He has received several awards for his scientific work including the Best Paper Runner Up Prize, Coller Institute of Venture, Israel (2017), Best Paper Finalist, Strategic Management Society (SMS), United States of America (2009), Best Paper Finalist, Israel Strategic Management Conference, Be'er Sheva, Israel (December 27–29, 2009), Winner of Robert J. Litschert - Best Doctoral Student Paper at Business Policy Division, Academy of Management, United States of America (2009).

For his teaching, Özcan has received Best Teacher award from WHU's Full-Time MBA II Class (2018), The Danish Society for the Advancement of Business Education (FUHU) Prize for Excellence in Teaching in Denmark (2012), Recognition for “outstanding” teaching and course coordination, Asian Studies Program, Copenhagen Business School (2007).
