= Şakir Özkan Torunlar =

Turkish diplomat

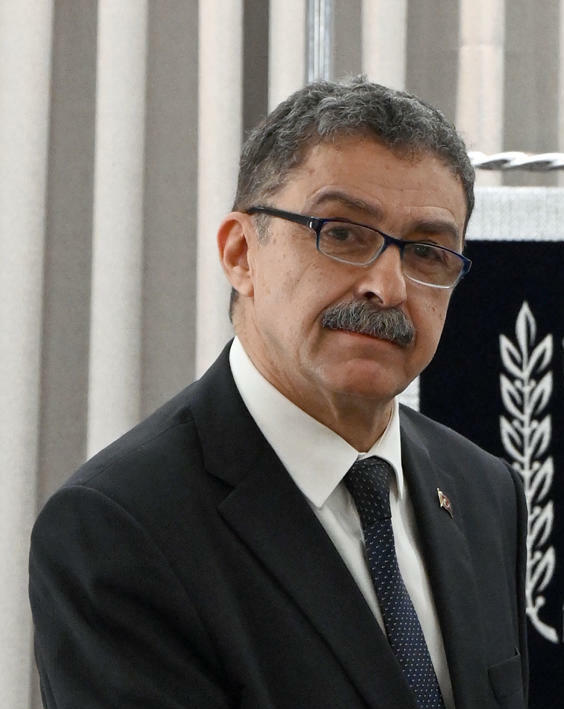

Ambassador of Turkey to Israel
- Incumbent
- Assumed office October 2022

Ambassador of Turkey to India
- In office January 2017 – May 2021

Consul General of Turkey to Jerusalem
- In office 2010–2014

Ambassador of Turkey to Bangladesh
- In office 2008–2010

Personal details
- Born: 1960 (age 65–66) Mersin, Turkey
- Education: University of Ankara
- Profession: Diplomat

Şakir Özkan Torunlar (born; 1960) is a Turkish diplomat who has served in various capacities in the Ministry of Foreign Affairs since joining in 1983. His diplomatic career spans several countries and includes roles such as Turkey's ambassador to Bangladesh, Consul General to Jerusalem, and ambassador to India. In 2022, he was appointed Turkey's ambassador to Tel Aviv, becoming the first ambassador to Israel from 2018 to October 2023 when the Turkish president recalled him over the humanitarian crisis during the Gaza war.

== Early life and education ==
Torunlar was born in 1960 in Mersin, Turkey. He graduated from TED Ankara College in 1977 and later from Ankara University Faculty of Political Science in 1982.

== Career ==
Torunlar joined the Ministry of Foreign Affairs (MFA) in 1983. He served as Attaché and Third Secretary in the Minister's Cabinet from 1983 to 1986 and North Africa, MFA, 2005 to 2007. He was also Deputy Director General for Security Affairs, MFA from 2007 to 2008.

He served as the Ambassador of Turkey to Bangladesh from 2008 to 2010. During this time he was recognized as Ambassador to the Kingdom of Bhutan and served as the Chairman of the Governing Board of the Islamic University of Technology (IUT), Gazipur, Bangladesh.

From 2010 to 2014, he served as Consul General in Jerusalem and held the role of Ambassador to Palestine. He has served as Director General of Bilateral Political Affairs (South Asia) in the Ministry of External Affairs since 2014.

From January 2017 to May 2021, he served as the Ambassador of Turkey to India. As of 2021, he is a member of the Foreign Policy Advisory Board.

In October 2022, he was appointed as Turkey's ambassador to Tel Aviv, making him the first ambassador to Israel since 2018. In October 2023 during the Gaza war, he was recalled by the Turkish president Recep Tayyip Erdogan over the humanitarian tragedy caused by Israel's continued attacks on civilians in Gaza.
