= Asik =

Asik may refer to:

- Aşik, a singer who accompanied his song with a lute in Azerbaijani and related Turkic cultures
- Aşık, a Turkish-language name

== See also ==
- T’asik, a village and rural community in the Syunik Province of Armenia
