= Aşık Sümmani =

Aşık Sümmani (1861–1915) was an Aşık, a singer who performed with a lute, from Narman, Erzurum Province, Ottoman Empire.

Sümmani's works encompass a wide range of forms, from the hece form- kosma, semai, and destan- to works in aruz form- divani, musammat, gazel, and müstezat.
