= Aşık Khanlar =

Khanlar Maharramov (Azerbaijani: Xanlar Məhərrəmov; 1950, Tovuz – 1998, Baku) was a famous Azerbaijani ashiq.

Ashig Khanlar Maharramov was born in January 1950 in the village of Alimardanli, Tovuz region.

He died in 1998 in Baku.
