= Bangladesh–Turkey defence cooperation =

Military and defence cooperation between Bangladesh and Turkey

- Parties: Bangladesh; Turkey
- Status: Active
- Key areas: Defence cooperation Joint production Drones and unmanned systems Defence industry

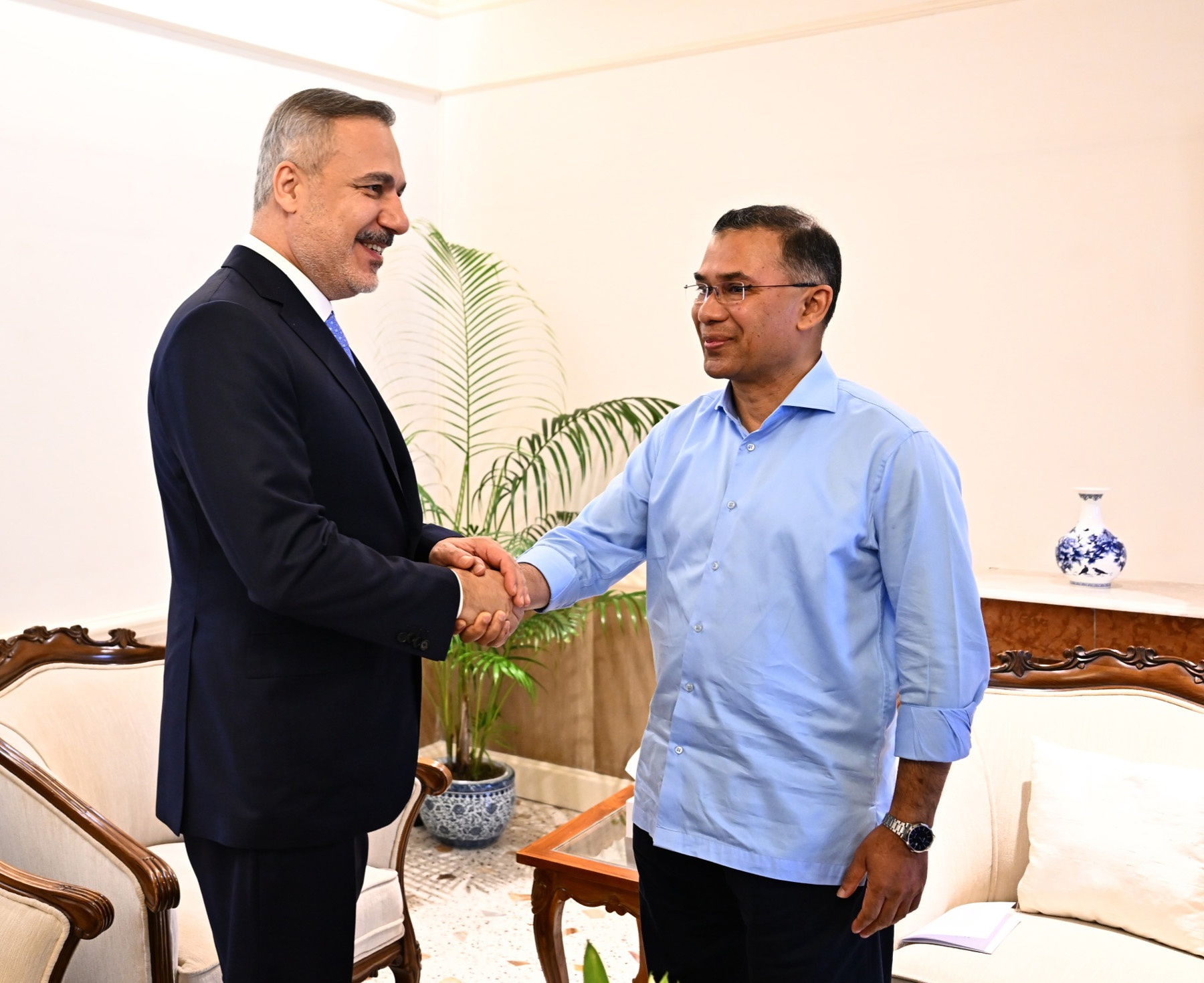
Turkish Foreign Minister Hakan Fidan meets Bangladeshi Prime Minister Tarique Rahman in Tejgaon, Dhaka, 6 June 2026.

Bangladesh–Turkey defence cooperation comprises military and defence-industrial cooperation between Bangladesh and Turkey. The relationship includes defence equipment, military contacts, training and discussions on defence production. In 2026, the two countries discussed possible cooperation in defence manufacturing and unmanned systems, while also establishing a ministerial mechanism for wider bilateral consultations.

The defence relationship forms part of the wider bilateral relationship between the two countries. Turkey recognized Bangladesh on 22 February 1974. The Turkish embassy in Dhaka opened in 1976, while the Bangladeshi embassy in Ankara opened in 1981.

== Defence cooperation ==
Bangladesh and Turkey have maintained defence contacts involving military equipment, training and cooperation between their defence sectors. In June 2026, discussions between the two countries included possible manufacture of military hardware in Bangladesh and wider defence-industrial cooperation.

According to The Diplomat, drones were a central subject of the discussions on possible defence production. The report described the proposed cooperation as involving the manufacture of military hardware in Bangladesh rather than as an announced delivery of a specific Turkish weapons system.

Nikkei Asia reported in June 2026 that Bangladesh was seeking partnerships with Turkey and China to develop a domestic drone industry. The report described the effort in the context of Bangladesh's plans to develop domestic defence production capabilities.

== Air defence ==
Air-defence cooperation has also been reported as a possible area of bilateral defence relations. In October 2025, Asia Times reported that a proposed Bangladesh–Turkey defence agreement could include the Turkish SİPER long-range air-defence system and potential co-production of Turkish combat drones.

The reported SİPER arrangement was not presented in the June 2026 sources cited in this article as a completed acquisition. The later reporting instead focused on proposed defence production, drones and broader military-technology cooperation.

== Institutional framework ==
During Turkish Foreign Minister Hakan Fidan's visit to Bangladesh in June 2026, Bangladesh and Turkey agreed to establish a joint committee involving their foreign and defence ministers. They also agreed to hold annual meetings at the foreign-minister level.

The mechanism forms part of a wider framework for bilateral consultations covering political, defence, trade and investment issues.

== 2026 visit ==
Fidan visited Bangladesh in June 2026 and held talks with Bangladeshi officials, including Foreign Minister Khalilur Rahman and Prime Minister Tarique Rahman. The discussions covered political relations, security, defence, trade and investment.

The visit was followed by the agreement to establish the joint committee and hold annual foreign-minister-level meetings. Defence-industrial cooperation, including possible production in Bangladesh, was also discussed during the visit.

== Regional alliances and strategic balance ==
Referring to the "Bangladesh First" policy, Prime Minister’s Foreign Affairs Adviser Humaiun Kobir said the government was pursuing a balanced foreign policy with national interests at its core. Bangladesh's position, he added, maintains a positive approach towards joining a potential economic or defence framework involving Saudi Arabia, Pakistan and Türkiye. Kobir also noted that Prime Minister Tarique Rahman's visit to Riyadh is likely to be finalised soon, while Dhaka is strengthening bilateral ties with Pakistan in trade and people-to-people connectivity.

== Bilateral relations ==
Defence cooperation forms part of the wider Bangladesh–Turkey relations. According to the Turkish Ministry of Foreign Affairs, the two countries established diplomatic relations in 1974 and subsequently opened embassies in Dhaka and Ankara.

Turkey also provided humanitarian assistance to Bangladesh following the arrival of large numbers of Rohingya people from Myanmar in 2017. Turkish officials visited Bangladesh and Rohingya refugee camps during the humanitarian response.

== See also ==
- Badr Memorandum of Understanding
- Bangladesh–Turkey relations
- Defence industry of Bangladesh
- Defence industry of Turkey
- Bangladesh Armed Forces
- Turkish Armed Forces
