= Otto Beisheim =

German businessman (1924–2013)

- Born: 3 January 1924; Weimar Republic
- Died: 18 February 2013 (aged 89); Rottach-Egern, Upper Bavaria, Germany
- Cause of death: Suicide by gunshot
- Occupation: Businessman

Otto Beisheim (3 January 1924 – 18 February 2013) was a German businessman and co-founder of Metro AG. In 2010, his net worth was estimated at US$3.6 billion.

== Early life ==
Beisheim was born on 3 January 1924, near Essen, Germany. He was the son of a caretaker, and his family was too poor to pay for him to attend high school, so he became a leather tradesman.

In October 1942, Otto Besheim voluntarily joined the Waffen-SS. During this time, he temporarily served as Sturmmann (Private) in the SS Division Leibstandarte in an artillery regiment on the Eastern Front. There is no historical indication that he was involved in war crimes during his assignment with the Waffen-SS. In 1943, Beisheim incurred a light injury in July in the Battle of Kursk in July 1943, and a severe injury in December near Berdychiv. In July 1944, following an extensive period of recovery in various military hospitals, Beisheim served as a private in an administrative unit before he was taken as a British prisoner of war in May 1945. He was released in March 1946.

== Career ==
After the war, Beisheim began his commercial career at the Wilhelm Nebel leather factory. After several positions in the iron and steel industry, he worked for the electrical trading company Stöcker & Reinshagen from 1959, where he became an authorized officer.

Returning to Germany, he founded Metro, the country's first cash-and-carry retailer, in 1964 at Mülheim an der Ruhr.

On 10 January 2004, Beisheim Center was officially opened on the northwest side of Potsdamer Platz in Berlin, built for 463 million euros, and including the Ritz-Carlton and Marriott chains.

In 2009, he sold 5.2% of the shares of Metro AG to various national and international investors; a further 3.1% could be sold. The WHU – Otto Beisheim School of Management, in Vallendar is named after him.

=== Awards ===
- Iron Cross II Class
- 1993: Doctor of Economics - honorary, the Technical University of Dresden
- 1994: Grand Federal Cross of Merit
- 2000: Bavarian Order of Merit
- 2003: Order of Merit of the State of Berlin
- 2003: Honorary Senator of WHU
- 2005: WHU ring of honor
- 2005: Honorary citizenship of all five valley communities in the Tegernsee valley
- 2008: Honorary doctorate from WHU

== Personal life and legacy ==
On 18 February 2013, Beisheim committed suicide in his home in Rottach-Egern, Germany. The Beisheim Group issued a statement that Beisheim chose to take his own life after being diagnosed with a terminal illness. Beisheim was intensely private and rarely in the public eye. Even at his company's shareholders' meetings, he was reported to have shown up on occasion masquerading under the name Müller.

Otto gave his name to the Beisheim Group, a family holding company for his interests in Metro AG.
