= Cahit Özkan =

Turkish politician (born 1976)

Cahit Özkan (born 25 December 1976 in Denizli, Turkey) is a Turkish politician and member of the Turkish Parliament. He is also Deputy for Denizli and a member of the Justice and Development Party.

He studied at Istanbul University's Faculty of Law and studied legal English in London.

Özkan received a master's degree in private law from the University of Kocaeli and in the field of human rights at Bilgi University in Istanbul.

His thesis was, “Trial Procedures in the European Court of Human Rights”.
