= Özcan Özel =

Turkish politician (born 1959)

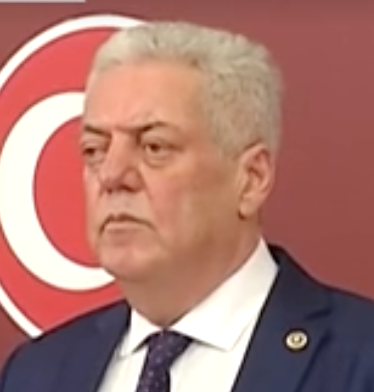

Member of the Grand National Assembly
- In office 7 July 2018 – 3 July 2023
- Constituency: Yalova (2018)

Deputy Chairman of Homeland Party
- Incumbent
- Assumed office May 17, 2021

Personal details
- Born: January 13, 1959 (age 67) Karamürsel, Kocaeli
- Party: Social Democratic Populist Party (1987–1995); Republican People's Party (1995–2021); Homeland Party (2021–present)
- Children: 2
- Occupation: Teacher; Politician

Özcan Özel (Turkish: [inˈdʒe];born 13 January 1959) was a Turkish politician and educator. In 2021, he joined the Homeland Party as Deputy Chairman.

== Personal life ==
Özcan Özel was born on January 13, 1959, in the Karamürsel district of Kocaeli province. He is married and has two children. In March 2023, his daughter, Duyşen Kuş (39), who had been battling cancer for some time, died in the hospital where she was receiving treatment in Istanbul.

== Career and education ==
Özel graduated from Bursa Institute of Education, Department of Mathematics in 1979. After completing his higher education, he worked as a mathematics teacher and principal in various educational institutions. He founded Yalova TAM Dershanesi, Together with Muharrem İnce.

In 1987, he became a member of the Yalova district organization of the Social Democratic Populist Party. In 1995, through the merger congress of the Social Democratic Populist Party and the Republican People's Party, he joined the Republican People's Party with the amalgamation of the two parties. In 1999, he served 3 years as director, 2 years as secretary, and 8 years as president in Yalova.

In the 2018 general elections, he was elected as 27th term Yalova MP. On January 29, 2021, he announced his resignation from CHP. On May 17, 2021, he joined the Homeland Party, and since he is Deputy Chairman.
