= Ahmet Özcan =

Swiss footballer (born 1995)

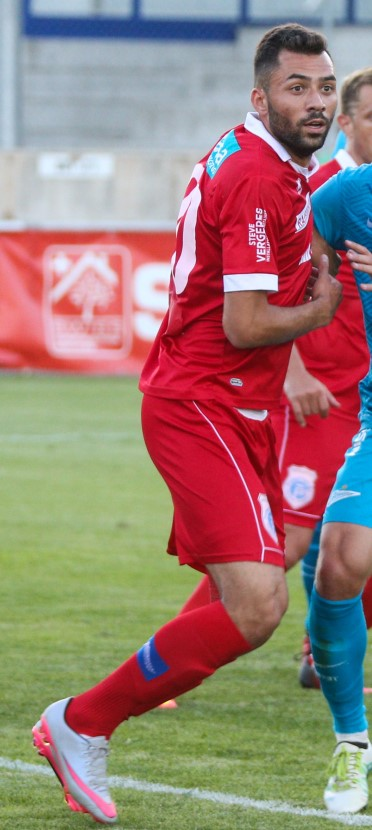

Personal information
- Full name: Ahmet Alper Özcan
- Date of birth: 7 March 1995 (age 31)
- Place of birth: Lausanne, Switzerland
- Height: 1.85 m (6 ft 1 in)
- Position: Centre-back

Team information
- Current team: Lausanne-Sport II
- Number: 4

Senior career*
Years	Team	Apps	(Gls)
2013–2014	Lausanne-Sport	2	(0)
2013–2014	Lausanne-Sport II	16	(1)
2014–2015	Kayserispor	0	(0)
2015	Gençlerbirliği	0	(0)
2015	→ Hacettepe (loan)	2	(0)
2015–2018	Sion II	43	(2)
2018	Linense	1	(0)
2018	Köniz	14	(0)
2019–2020	Dunărea Călărași	13	(0)
2021–2022	Vevey United	20	(0)
2022–2023	Bulle	18	(0)
2023–	Lausanne-Sport II	11	(0)

International career
2013	Switzerland U19	3	(0)
- * Club domestic league appearances and goals as of 21:11, 24 March 2024 (UTC)

Ahmet Özcan (born 7 March 1995) is a Swiss professional football who plays as a centre-back for the reserve team of Lausanne-Sport.

== Club career ==
Özcan made his professional debut for Lausanne-Sport in a Swiss Super League 4–0 loss to FC Zürich on 7 December 2013. He transferred over to Kayserispor on 2014, wherein he only made appearances with the youth team and then briefly transferred to Gençlerbirliği.

In July 2023, Özcan returned to Lausanne-Sport, signing for the club's reserve team.

== International career ==
Özcan was born in Switzerland and is of Turkish descent. He is a youth international for Switzerland at the U19 level.
