= Özcan Yeniçeri =

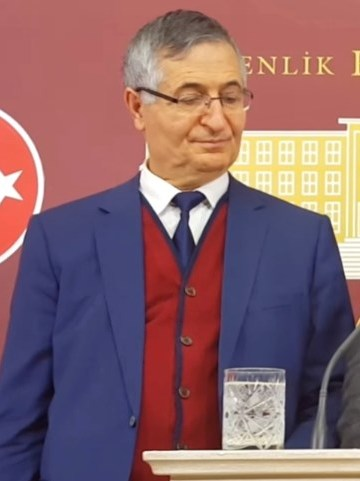

Member of the Grand National Assembly
- In office 2011–2015

Personal details
- Born: Özcan Yeniçeri; 1 January 1954 (age 71) Şiran, Turkey
- Political party: Nationalist Movement Party

Özcan Yeniçeri (born on 1 January 1954), is a Turkish politician and academic who had been a member of the Grand National Assembly from 2011 to 2015.
