= Marjorie Merryman =

American classical composer (born 1951)

Marjorie Merryman (born 1951) is an American composer, author, and music educator. She is a member of the composition faculty at the Manhattan School of Music since 2007, where she also served as Interim President, Provost and Senior Vice President at Manhattan School of Music. She previously taught at Boston University and Macalester College.

While at BU, she was commissioned by many professional musical ensembles to write pieces ranging from small chamber works to a full opera. She has written and published pieces such as "Chinese Moon Poems", a women's choral piece based on Chinese poems about the moon. Merryman categorizes herself with other twentieth-century composers heavily influenced by Johannes Brahms—in particular, serialist composers such as those of the Second Viennese School.

She has been the recipient of numerous awards, including two prizes from the American Academy of Arts and Letters, the Walter Hinrichsen Award, presented annually by American Academy of Arts and Letters and in 2014, the "Arts and Letters Award in Music: "This award is given in recognition of "…. outstanding artistic achievement and acknowledges the composer who has arrived at his or her own voice."

She has also received the League of Composers/International Society for Contemporary Music, the WBZ Fund for the Arts, and Composers, Inc. (Lee Ettelson Composer's Award). Among her other awards are fellowships or grants from Tanglewood, the Radcliffe Institute for Advanced Study, and the National Endowment for the Arts - Meet the Composer program. She has been Composer-in- Residence of the New England Philharmonic and the Billings (MT) Symphony Orchestra, and has served on the boards of the New England Composers’ Orchestra, the Lily Boulanger Foundation, Alea III and many others. Her works are published by C.F. Peters, E.C. Schirmer, APNM, and G. Schirmer; and recorded on the Koch and New World labels.

== Publications ==
- Merryman, Marjorie (1996): The Music Theory Handbook Schirmer; 1st edition 144 pp ISBN 978-0-15-502662-9. (This is a concise and methodical introduction to both tonal and atonal music analysis. The book is taught at many American music schools, including Boston University.)
