= Eriş Özkan =

Turkish footballer

Personal information
- Full name: Eriş Özkan
- Date of birth: 1 September 1981 (age 45)
- Place of birth: Bursa, Turkey
- Position: Defender

Senior career*
| Years | Team | Apps | (Gls) |
| 2000–2004 | Kütahyaspor | | |
| 2004–2005 | Erzincanspor | | |
| 2005–2006 | Eskişehirspor | | |
| 2007 | Kardemir Karabükspor | | |
| 2007–2008 | Şanlıurfa Belediyespor | | |
| 2008–2009 | Afyonkarahisarspor | | |
| 2009–2010 | İnegölspor | | |
- * Club domestic league appearances and goals

Eriş Özkan (born 1 September 1981 in Bursa) is a Turkish professional footballer who plays as a defender for İnegölspor in the TFF Third League.

He formerly played for Kütahyaspor, Erzincanspor, Eskişehirspor, Kardemir D.Ç. Karabükspor, Şanlıurfa Belediyespor, Afyonkarahisarspor and Göztepe. He appeared in five TFF First League matches with Eskişehirspor during 2006.
