= Sudi Özkan =

Turkish hotelier (1939–2026)

- Born: 1939; Adana, Turkey
- Died: 2 October 2026 (aged 87); Istanbul, Turkey
- Occupation: Businessman
- Children: 6

Sudi Özkan (1939 – 2 October 2026) was a Turkish businessman.

== Life and career ==
Özkan was the owner of Princess Hotel and Casino in Guyana, which is a subsidiary of the Princess Hotel Group. The multi-million-dollar facility, Princess Casino Guyana, was the country's first-ever casino and opened its doors with grandeur, accompanied by entertainment and high-end service. The decision for the Princess Hotel group to invest in Guyana's market stemmed from a visit by Özkan two years prior to the casino's inauguration, indicative of his belief in the country's economic potential.

Özkan, who had six children from his two marriages, died in Istanbul on 2 October 2026 at the age of 87. He was laid to rest at Kumburgaz Cemetery in Büyükçekmece.
