= Mustafa Özcan Güneşdoğdu =

Mustafa Özcan Güneşdoğdu is a Qur'an reciter of Turkish descent. Born in 1970 in Çankırı, Turkey, he currently lives in Turkey. His Call to Prayer (Adhan) was featured on the accompanying CD for the book Approaching the Qur'an, written by Michael Sells.

Mustafa also won the Qur'an recitation competition in Saudi Arabia in 1991. He is also a singer of nasheed.

== See also ==
- Quran
- Qirat
- Tajweed
