= Əlimərdanlı =

- Municipality
- Location within Azerbaijan
- Coordinates: 41°02′33″N 45°40′35″E
- Country: Azerbaijan
- Rayon: Tovuz

Population
  - Total: 3,060
- Time zone: UTC+4 (AZT)
  - Summer (DST): UTC+5 (AZT)

Əlimərdanlı (also, Alimardanly) is a village and municipality in the Tovuz Rayon of Azerbaijan. It has a population of 3,060.

== Notable natives ==
- Mardan Musayev — Hero of the Soviet Union.
