= Munzur University =

Public university in Tunceli, Turkey

- Munzur Üniversitesi
- Established: 2008
- Rector: Prof. Dr. Ubeyde İpek
- Location: Tunceli, Turkey
- Website: Official website

Munzur University (Turkish:Munzur Üniversitesi) is a university located in Tunceli, Turkey. It was established in 2008 as "Tunceli Üniversitesi". In time, the university has grown to have 7 faculties, 3 vocational schools, and 6 institutes.

It is named after a nearby mountain.

== Faculties ==
- Faculty of Letters
- Faculty of Fine Arts
- Faculty of Economics and Administrative Science
- Faculty of Communication
- Faculty of Engineering
- Faculty of Sport Sciences
- Faculty of Fisheries
