= Özcan Mutlu =

Turkish-German politician (born 1968)

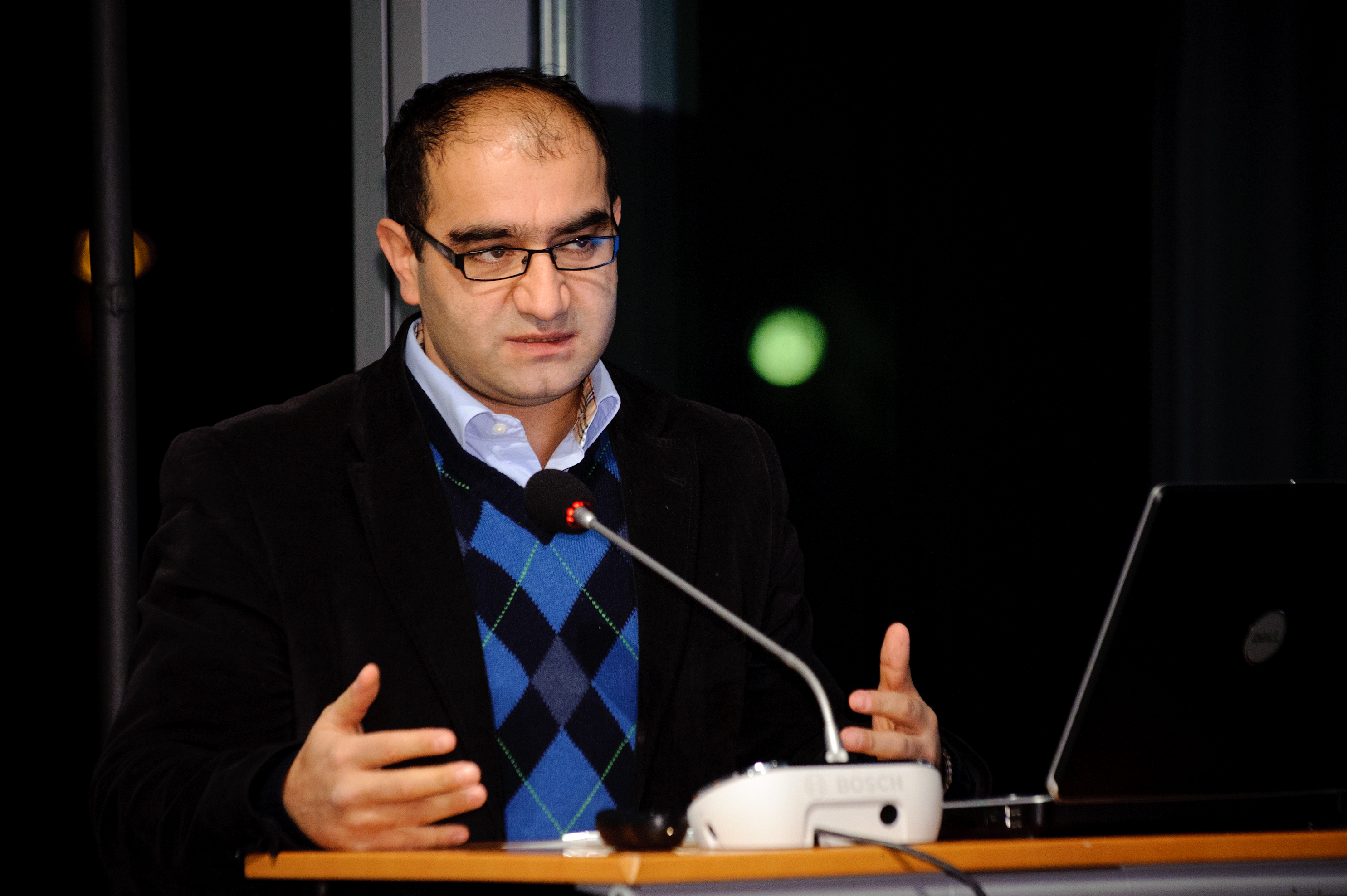
- Mutlu in 2010

Member of the Bundestag
- In office 2013–2017

Personal details
- Born: January 10, 1968 (age 58) Kelkit, Gümüşhane Province, Turkey
- Citizenship: German
- Party: Alliance '90/The Greens
- Children: Two
- Education: Technische Universität Berlin; Beuth University of Applied Sciences Berlin
- Occupation: Politician
- Profession: Electrical engineering
- Website: www.mutlu.de

Özcan Mutlu (born January 10, 1968) is a Turkish-German former politician from the Green Party. In January 2025, he left the party because of "toxic power structures" in the Berlin regional association of the Greens.

== Early years ==
Mutlu has lived in the Berlin district of Kreuzberg since 1973. He received his naturalization in 1990.

== Education ==
He completed his training as an information electrician at Technische Universität Berlin from September 1985 to February 1989.

Afterwards, he studied electrical engineering at the Beuth University of Applied Sciences Berlin from 1989 to 1993 and graduated as an engineer of communication and electronics.

He combined an internship with a stay abroad in Omaha, (USA).

After this, he worked in a telecommunication company as an engineer from 1993 to 1999.

== Political career ==
Mutlu joined the Green Party in 1990, and was elected into the district assembly of Kreuzberg. He entered the regional parliament Abgeordnetenhaus of Berlin in 1999 representing the district Friedrichshain-Kreuzberg. He was re-elected in 2006 and 2011. During this period, he served in a number of parliamentary commissions, responsible particularly for policies of education, integration and migration as well as policies for Europe and Turkey.

Mutlu was nominated by his party for the 2009 federal election; however, he missed the entry into the Bundestag. Following the 2013 federal election, Mutlu won a seat in the Bundestag. He was one of the eleven politicians of Turkish descent who entered the federal parliament, including seven women. In parliament, he served on the Committee on Education, Research and Technology Assessment. On the committee, he was his parliamentary group’s rapporteur on citizen participation.

== Other activities ==
- Bilingual German-Turkish Europe School, Founding Member
- Sister city agreement between Kreuzberg and Kadıköy, Istanbul, Founding Member
- German Marshall Fund, Marshall-Memorial Fellow
- Stiftung Lesen, Member of the Board of Trustees
- Young leader of the Atlantik-Brücke (2000)

== Controversy ==
When Mutlu voted in a favor of a symbolic resolution in 2016 that remembered and condemned the 1915 Armenian genocide by Ottoman forces, which Turkey refuses to acknowledge, he became one of eleven MPs of Turkish origin who received increased police protection and further security measures for both their professional and private activities. Also, Germany's foreign ministry warned him against travelling to Turkey because his safety could not be guaranteed after statements by Turkish President Tayyip Erdoğan suggesting that German lawmakers of Turkish origin had "tainted blood".

== Personal life ==
Mutlu is married and has two children.
