= Tuba Özkan-Haller =

Turkish-American earth scientist and academic

Hatcem Tuba Özkan-Haller
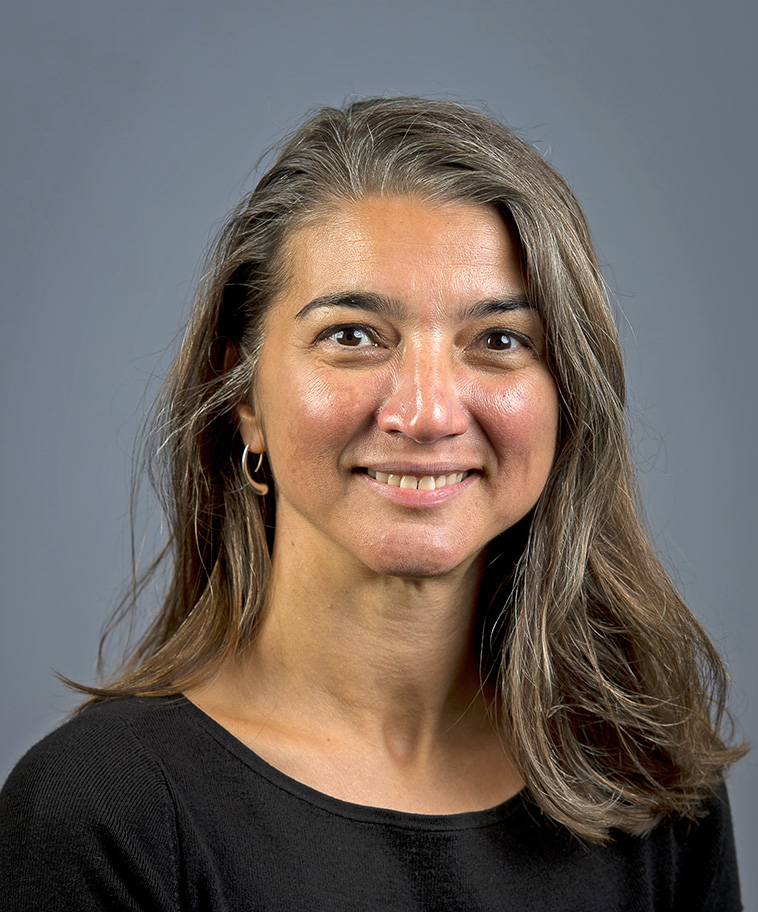
- Born: Turkey
- Education: University of Delaware; Boğaziçi University
- Scientific career
- Workplaces: University of Michigan; Oregon State University
- Thesis: Nonlinear evolution of shear instabilities of the longshore current (1998)
- Website: Official Website

Hatcem Tuba Özkan-Haller is a Turkish–American earth scientist who is a professor at Oregon State University. She currently holds the position of Dean of the College of Earth, Ocean, and Atmospheric Sciences at Oregon State University. Her research makes use of numerical, field, lab and analytical approaches to comprehend physical processes in the nearshore ocean.

== Early life and education ==
Özkan-Haller is the daughter of an admiral in the Turkish navy and says that she had an oceanic upbringing. She studied civil engineering at the Boğaziçi University in Istanbul. She moved to the United States for graduate studies, where she earned a master's degree and a PhD in civil engineering at the University of Delaware. Her research considered the evolution of shear instabilities in longshore currents. After earning her doctorate, she moved to the University of Michigan, where she was on the faculty for three years.

== Research and career ==
Özkan-Haller joined Oregon State University in 2001. Her research looks to generate a predictive understanding of the ocean. She has investigated the impact of three-dimensional "surfzone" eddy currents and their role in distributing pollutants and marine organisms. She used Acoustic Doppler current profilers to make observations of surf zone mean currents and eddies, which she combined with numerical models.

Özkan-Haller has held positions at Oregon State including Associate Vice President for Research Administration and Development and Interim Dean. She serves on the National Oceanic and Atmospheric Administration Hydrographic Survey Review Panel and the United States Army Corps of Engineers Coastal Engineering Research Board. Additionally, she is involved in a National Science Foundation Advance Grant aiming to enhance the participation of women in earth sciences. She is part of an Advance Grant that looks to improve the participation of women in earth sciences.

== Awards and honors ==
- Office of Naval Research Young Investigator Award

== Selected publications ==
- Holman, R.; Stanley, J.; Ozkan-Haller, T. (October 2003). "Applying video sensor networks to nearshore environment monitoring". IEEE Pervasive Computing. 2 (4): 14–21. doi:10.1109/mprv.2003.1251165. ISSN 1536-1268.
- Lenee-Bluhm, Pukha; Paasch, Robert; Özkan-Haller, H. Tuba (August 2011). "Characterizing the wave energy resource of the US Pacific Northwest". Renewable Energy. 36 (8): 2106–2119. doi:10.1016/j.renene.2011.01.016. ISSN 0960-1481.
- Özkan-Haller, H. Tuba; Kirby, James T. (15 November 1999). "Nonlinear evolution of shear instabilities of the longshore current: A comparison of observations and computations". Journal of Geophysical Research: Oceans. 104 (C11): 25953–25984. Bibcode:1999JGR...10425953O. doi:10.1029/1999jc900104. ISSN 0148-0227.
