= Gülsel Özkan =

German film director and screenwriter

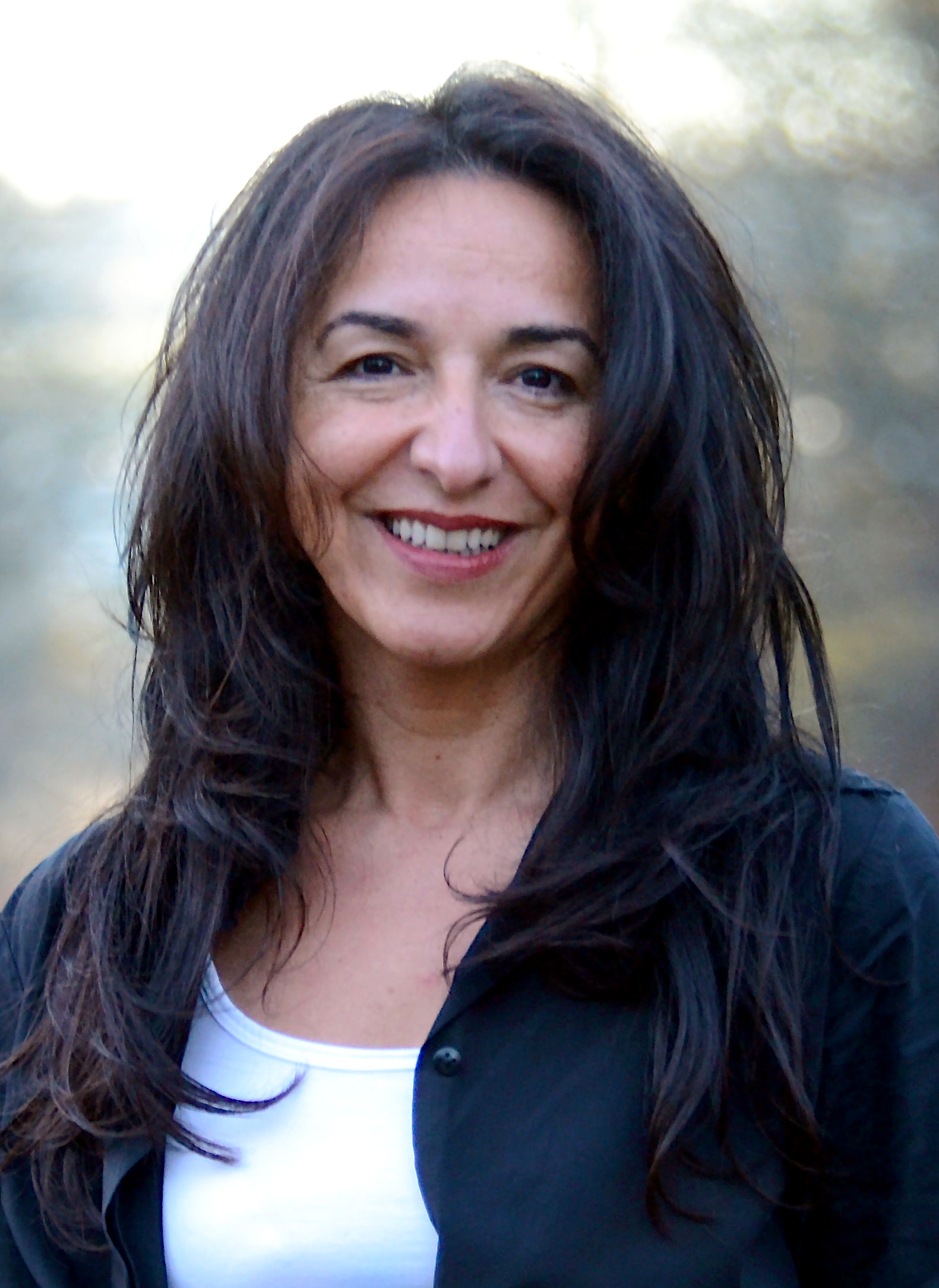
Gülsel Özkan (2015)

Gülsel Özkan (born 1966 in Malatya, Turkey) is a German film director and screenwriter.

== Biography ==
Özkan began film studies at the Hamburg Academy of Fine Arts in 1987, which she completed with distinction. Since 1989 she has been working as a freelance filmmaker, dramaturg and producer and realizes documentaries and features for ARD, arte, NDR, WDR, BR, DW Phönix, H3, MDR and SFB as well as international stations such as Spain TVE, 3sat and Planet France. Özkan also works as a director and screenwriter for documentaries and feature films. Her films have been broadcast internationally and have received several nominations.

Since 2012, Özkan has been working together with Ludger Pfanz on new dramaturgical models. Combining classical media and film dramaturgy, they developed storytelling for new digital, multimedia, transmedia and interactive media for "space-time narratives" and "space-time experiences".

Özkan is also a jury member and jury president at many national and international festivals, including the "Türk Film Festival" in Mannheim/Heidelberg, the "Ökofilmfestival" in Freiburg, the "African International Woman Filmfestival" in Harare, the "CEVE-Festival" in Beijing and the VR-Festival in Nanchang.

Özkan is managing director of the Future Design Company GmbH (formerly Planet Film GmbH) and artistic director of the Beyond Festival, which has been held in Karlsruhe, Germany, since 2011.
