= Özcan Köksoy =

Turkish footballer (1940–2022)

Personal information
- Full name: Mehmet Özcan Köksoy
- Date of birth: 16 November 1940
- Place of birth: Istanbul, Turkey
- Date of death: 23 March 2022 (aged 81)
- Place of death: Istanbul, Turkey
- Position: Defender

Senior career*
Years	Team	Apps	(Gls)
1959–1961	Fatih Karagümrük	54	(1)
1961–1969	Fenerbahçe	110	(1)

International career
1965	Turkey	1	(0)
- * Club domestic league appearances and goals

Özcan Köksoy (16 November 1940 – 23 March 2022) was a Turkish footballer who played as a defender. He made one appearance for the Turkey national team in 1965.

== Honours ==
Fenerbahçe

- Süper Lig: 1963–64, 1964–65, 1967–68
- Turkish Cup: 1967–68
- Presidential Cup: 1968
- Balkans Cup: 1966–67
