= List of ambassadors of Turkey to Bangladesh =

The list of ambassadors of Turkey to Bangladesh provides a chronological record of individuals who have served as the diplomatic representatives of the Republic of Turkey to the People's Republic of Bangladesh.

== List of ambassadors ==
Ambassador	Term start	Term end	Ref.
Faruk Loğoğlu	1 November 1976	1 September 1978	
Ekrem Gökşin	23 July 1978	23 January 1981	
Metin Sirman	1 February 1982	30 October 1984	
Halit Güvener	14 December 1984	11 February 1988	
Muammer Tuncer	6 March 1988	11 December 1989	
Ahmet Ermişoğlu	27 December 1989	16 May 1993	
Kutlu Özgüvenç	20 May 1993	18 November 1995	
Kemal Özcan Davaz	29 November 1995	28 April 1998	
Erdinç Ulumlu	12 May 1998	19 July 2002	
Ferit Ergin	1 August 2002	2 May 2008	
Şakir Özkan Torunlar	15 May 2008	31 March 2010	
Mehmet Vakur Erkul	1 August 2010	26 February 2013	
Hüseyin Müftüoğlu	26 February 2013	15 August 2015	
Devrim Öztürk	20 August 2015	31 December 2019	
Mustafa Osman Turan	15 January 2020	15 February 2023	
Ramis Şen	Unknown	Present	

== See also ==
- Bangladesh–Turkey relations
