= Driller =

Driller may refer to:

- Driller (oil), a job in the oil industry
- Driller (video game), a 1987 game for various 8- and 16-bit home microcomputers
- The Driller, a giant alien creature in the Transformers films - see List of Transformers film series cast and characters

== See also ==
- Drill
- Drilling
