= Özkan Zengin =

Turkish serial killer of gay men (born 1982)

Özkan Zengin (born 1982) is a Turkish serial killer who committed the homicide of at least three gay males. He was nicknamed "The Well Driller Killer" because he threw his victims into a well near the crime scene. Zengin confessed that he also stole the money of the individuals he murdered. According to Zengin, he murdered gay individuals due to the feeling of guilt he felt after sexual encounters he had with his victims. His modus operandi mostly consisted of cutting the throat of his victims before throwing them in a well in the immediate area where he had a sexual relationship with them. Cutting the throat of his victims would be unsuccessful at killing them immediately, so he would usually bludgeon his victims to death with nearby items before throwing them in a hole or a well, burying one of his victims alive in one case.

Zengin was born in Istanbul in 1982. He was unmarried. He worked in a bakery. He started committing murder in May 2008 and killed four people by cutting their throats with one month between murders.

Zengin was arrested on 20 November 2008. He told the police that "the well was his piggy bank," and he was sentenced to life imprisonment.

His identified victims were, from the oldest to the youngest: Yaşar Mızrak (44), Mehmet Naci Zeyrek (30) and teacher Enes Arıcı (25). He reportedly confessed to killing two other individuals (Aziz Taşdemir and Tarık Güzeller) as well.

== See also ==
- List of serial killers by country
- List of serial killers by number of victims
