= Âşık Ali İzzet Özkan =

- Born: 1902; Şarkışla, Ottoman Empire
- Died: 1981 (aged 78–79) Istanbul, Turkey
- Genres: Ashik, Turkish folk music, Turkish makam
- Occupation: composer

Âşık Ali İzzet Özkan (1902–1981) was a Turkish ashik and poet. A native of Şarkışla, Özkan became an ashik at a young age, and went to Adana at the age of 22 to compete with other ashiks from Çukurova. Özkan wandered throughout Turkey for many years and composer numerous original poems. He also participated in the festival of Turkish ashiks held in Konya.

== See also ==
- List of Turkic-languages poets
