= Baile chino =

Chilean ritual dance

Baile Chino is a ritual dance originating in Norte Chico and Zona Central regions of Chile. Flautists, drummers and dancers move in a group and express devotion to Jesus and the Virgin Mary. Dancers flex their legs and hop while flautists play pifilca flutes. It was added to the UNESCO Representative List of the Intangible Cultural Heritage of Humanity in 2014. Traditionally, the baile chino is a strictly male institution, but often has a female flag bearer. Dancers and musicians form two symmetrical columns that is led by a single singer (known as an alférez) reciting couplets regarding religious concepts or stories.

The name 'chino' refers to the Quechua and Aymara term for servant.

== History ==
Baile Chino originated in the pre-Columbian era of central Chile, in approximately 900 to 1400 AD. People in this era fabricated flutes similar to the pifilca flute used in modern-day Baile chino. Syncretism with the Catholicism of Spanish conquistadors produced the religious influence seen today.

== See also ==
- Diablada
