= List of Intangible Cultural Heritage elements in Qatar =

The United Nations Educational, Scientific and Cultural Organisation (UNESCO) intangible cultural heritage elements are the non-physical traditions and practices performed by a people. As part of a country's cultural heritage, they include celebrations, festivals, performances, oral traditions, music, and the making of handicrafts. The "intangible cultural heritage" is defined by the Convention for the Safeguarding of Intangible Cultural Heritage, drafted in 2003 and took effect in 2006. Inscription of new heritage elements on the UNESCO Intangible Cultural Heritage Lists is determined by the Intergovernmental Committee for the Safeguarding of Intangible Cultural Heritage, an organisation established by the convention.

Qatar signed the convention on 1 September 2008.

== Intangible Cultural Heritage of Humanity ==
+ Transnational element

=== Representative List ===
Name	Image	Year	No.	Description
Majlis, a cultural and social space + (Note: Shared with Oman, Saudi Arabia, and the United Arab Emirates.)		2015	01076	Majlis –meaning "sitting room"– is a meeting place for society's individuals to debate matters and local issues, exchange news and resolve conflicts.
Arabic coffee, a symbol of generosity + (Note: Shared with Oman, Saudi Arabia, Jordan, and the United Arab Emirates.)		2015	02111	
Falconry, a living human heritage + (Note: Shared with Austria, Belgium, Croatia, Czechia, France, Germany, Hungary, Ireland, Italy, Kazakhstan, Kyrgyzstan, Mongolia, Morocco, Netherlands, Pakistan, Poland, Portugal, Slovakia, Saudi Arabia, South Korea, Spain, Syria, and the United Arab Emirates.)		2021	01708	The origin of falconry goes back to the use of hunting by birds of prey as a mean of hunting but it has evolved over time to become part of the cultural heritage of the people.
Date palm, knowledge, skills, traditions and practices + (Note: Shared with Bahrain, Egypt, Iraq, Jordan, Kuwait, Mauritania, Morocco, Oman, Palestine, Saudi Arabia, Sudan, Tunisia, the United Arab Emirates, and Yemen.)		2022	01902	The Palm tree is considered to be a part of the history of the countries where it is a source for farmers, craftsmen, handicrafts owners, merchants, factory owners and food companies.
Henna, rituals, aesthetic and social practices + (Note: Shared with Algeria, Saudi Arabia, Bahrain, Egypt, United Arab Emirates, Iraq, Jordan, Kuwait, Morocco, Mauritania, Oman, Palestine, Sudan, Tunisia, and Yemen.)		2024	02116	A temporary tattooing practice with medicinal and aesthetic motivations.
Bisht (men's Abaa): skills and practices + (Note: Shared with Bahrain, Iraq, Jordan, Kuwait, Oman, Saudi Arabia, Syria, and the United Arab Emirates.)		2025	02233	A bisht is a traditional men's cloak popular in the Arab world for hundreds of years.

== See also ==
- List of World Heritage Sites in Qatar
