= List of Intangible Cultural Heritage elements in Kuwait =

The United Nations Educational, Scientific and Cultural Organisation (UNESCO) intangible cultural heritage elements are the non-physical traditions and practices performed by a people. As part of a country's cultural heritage, they include celebrations, festivals, performances, oral traditions, music, and the making of handicrafts. The "intangible cultural heritage" is defined by the Convention for the Safeguarding of Intangible Cultural Heritage, drafted in 2003 and took effect in 2006. Inscription of new heritage elements on the UNESCO Intangible Cultural Heritage Lists is determined by the Intergovernmental Committee for the Safeguarding of Intangible Cultural Heritage, an organisation established by the convention.

Kuwait signed the convention on 9 April 2015.

== Intangible Cultural Heritage of Humanity ==
+ Transnational element

=== Representative List ===
| Name | Image | Year | No. | Description |
|---|---|---|---|---|
| Traditional weaving of Al Sadu + (Note: Shared with Qatar and Saudi Arabia.) | | 2020 | 02158 | Al Sadu, or simply Sadu, describes an embroidery form in geometrical shapes hand-woven by Bedouin people. |
| Arabic calligraphy: knowledge, skills and practices + (Note: Shared with Algeria, Bahrain, Egypt, Iraq, Jordan, Lebanon, Mauritania, Morocco, Oman, Palestine, Saudi Arabia, Sudan, Tunisia, the United Arab Emirates, and Yemen.) | | 2021 | 01718 | The artistic practice of writing Arabic letters and words to convey grace and beauty. |
| Date palm, knowledge, skills, traditions and practices + (Note: Shared with Bahrain, Egypt, Iraq, Jordan, Mauritania, Morocco, Oman, Palestine, Qatar, Saudi Arabia, Sudan, Tunisia, the United Arab Emirates, and Yemen.) | | 2022 | 01902 | The Palm tree is considered to be a part of the history of the countries where it is a source for farmers, craftsmen, handicrafts owners, merchants, factory owners and food companies. |
| Henna, rituals, aesthetic and social practices + (Note: Shared with Algeria, Saudi Arabia, Bahrain, Egypt, United Arab Emirates, Iraq, Jordan, Palestine, Morocco, Mauritania, Oman, Qatar, Sudan, Tunisia, and Yemen.) | | 2024 | 02116 | A temporary tattooing practice with medicinal and aesthetic motivations. |
| Bisht (men's Abaa): skills and practices + (Note: Shared with Bahrain, Iraq, Jordan, Oman, Qatar, Saudi Arabia, Syria, and the United Arab Emirates.) | | 2025 | 02233 | A bisht is a traditional men's cloak popular in the Arab world for hundreds of years. |
| The Diwaniya, a unifying cultural practice in Kuwait | | 2025 | 02281 | |

=== Good Safeguarding Practices ===
| Name | Year | No. | Description |
|---|---|---|---|
| Al Sadu Educational Programme: Train the trainers in the art of weaving | 2022 | 01905 | Al Sadu, or simply Sadu, describes an embroidery form in geometrical shapes hand-woven by Bedouin people. |
