= List of Intangible Cultural Heritage elements in Albania =

The United Nations Educational, Scientific and Cultural Organisation (UNESCO) intangible cultural heritage elements are the non-physical traditions and practices performed by a people. As part of a country's cultural heritage, they include celebrations, festivals, performances, oral traditions, music, and the making of handicrafts. The "intangible cultural heritage" is defined by the Convention for the Safeguarding of Intangible Cultural Heritage, drafted in 2003 and took effect in 2006. Inscription of new heritage elements on the UNESCO Intangible Cultural Heritage Lists is determined by the Intergovernmental Committee for the Safeguarding of Intangible Cultural Heritage, an organisation established by the convention.

Albania ratified the convention 4 April 2006.

== Intangible Cultural Heritage of Humanity ==
+ Transnational element

=== Representative List ===
| Name | Image | Year | No. | Description |
|---|---|---|---|---|
| Albanian folk iso-polyphony | | 2008 | 00155 | Iso-polyphony is a traditional part of Albanian folk music. |
| Transhumance, the seasonal droving of livestock + (Note: Shared with Andorra, Austria, Croatia, France, Greece, Italy, Luxembourg, Romania, and Spain.) | | 2023 | 01964 | Transhumance is a type of pastoralism or nomadism, a seasonal movement of livestock between fixed summer and winter pastures. |
| K'cimi dancing of Tropojë | | 2024 | 01881 | Traditional folk dance from the region of Tropojë. |

=== Elements in Need of Urgent Safeguarding ===
| Name | Image | Year | No. | Description |
|---|---|---|---|---|
| Xhubleta, skills, craftsmanship and forms of usage | | 2022 | 01880 | The xhubleta is an undulating, bell-shaped folk skirt, worn by Albanian women. |
| Art of playing, singing and making the Lahutë | | 2025 | 02310 | The Lahutë is a bowed single-stringed musical instrument and musical style traditionally used in the Balkans. |

== See also ==
- List of World Heritage Sites in Albania
