= List of Intangible Cultural Heritage elements in Cyprus =

The United Nations Educational, Scientific and Cultural Organisation (UNESCO) intangible cultural heritage elements are the non-physical traditions and practices performed by a people. As part of a country's cultural heritage, they include celebrations, festivals, performances, oral traditions, music, and the making of handicrafts. The "intangible cultural heritage" is defined by the Convention for the Safeguarding of Intangible Cultural Heritage, drafted in 2003 and took effect in 2006. Inscription of new heritage elements on the UNESCO Intangible Cultural Heritage Lists is determined by the Intergovernmental Committee for the Safeguarding of Intangible Cultural Heritage, an organisation established by the convention.

Cyprus ratified the convention on 24 February 2006.

== Intangible Cultural Heritage of Humanity ==
+ Transnational element

=== Representative List ===
Name	Image	Year	No.	Description
Lefkara laces or Lefkaritika		2009	00255	A common sight in Pano Lefkara is groups of women who sit in the narrow village streets working on their fine embroidery, as they have since at least the fourteenth century.
Tsiattista poetic duelling		2011	00536	The Tsiattista is a traditional oral poetic form, which is practiced with musical accompaniment of violin and lute.
Mediterranean diet + (Note: Shared with Croatia, Greece, Italy, Morocco, Portugal, and Spain.)		2013	00884	The Mediterranean diet is the traditional food and methods of preparation used by the people of the Mediterranean basin.
Art of dry stone construction, knowledge and techniques + (Note: Shared with Croatia, France, Greece, Italy, Slovenia, Spain, Switzerland, Andorra, Austria, Belgium, Ireland, and Luxembourg.)		2018	02106	Dry stone is a building method by which structures are constructed from stones without any mortar to bind them together.
Byzantine chant + (Note: Shared with Greece.)		2019	01508	Byzantine music originally consisted of the songs and hymns composed for the courtly and religious ceremonial of the Byzantine Empire and continued, after the fall of Constantinople in 1453, in the traditions of the sung Byzantine chant of Eastern Orthodox liturgy.
Midwifery: knowledge, skills and practices + (Note: Shared with Colombia, Germany, Kyrgyzstan, Luxembourg, Nigeria, Slovenia, and Togo.)		2023	01968	A midwife is a health professional who cares for mothers and newborns.
Commandaria wine		2025	02288	Commandaria is an amber-coloured sweet dessert wine made in the Commandaria region.

=== Good Safeguarding Practices ===
Name	Year	No.	Description
Tocatì, a shared programme for the safeguarding of traditional games and sports + (Note: Shared with Belgium, Croatia, France, and Italy.)	2022	01709	

== See also ==
- List of World Heritage Sites in Cyprus
