= List of Intangible Cultural Heritage elements in Germany =

The United Nations Educational, Scientific and Cultural Organisation (UNESCO) intangible cultural heritage elements are the non-physical traditions and practices performed by a people. As part of a country's cultural heritage, they include celebrations, festivals, performances, oral traditions, music, and the making of handicrafts. The "intangible cultural heritage" is defined by the Convention for the Safeguarding of Intangible Cultural Heritage, drafted in 2003 and took effect in 2006. Inscription of new heritage elements on the UNESCO Intangible Cultural Heritage Lists is determined by the Intergovernmental Committee for the Safeguarding of Intangible Cultural Heritage, an organisation established by the convention.

Germany ratified the convention on 10 April 2013.

== Intangible Cultural Heritage of Humanity ==
+ Transnational element

=== Representative List ===
Name	Image	Year	No.	Description
Idea and practice of organizing shared interests in cooperatives		2016	01200	
Organ craftsmanship and music		2017	01277	
Blaudruck/Modrotisk/Kékfestés/Modrotlač, resist block printing and indigo dyeing in Europe + (Note: Shared with Austria, Czechia, Hungary and Slovakia.)		2018	01365	
Falconry, a living human heritage + (Note: Shared with Austria, Belgium, Croatia, Czechia, France, Hungary, Ireland, Italy, Kazakhstan, Republic of Korea, Kyrgyzstan, Mongolia, Morocco, Netherlands, Pakistan, Poland, Portugal, Qatar, Saudi Arabia, Slovakia, Spain, Syria, and the United Arab Emirates.)		2021	01708	
The practice of Modern Dance in Germany		2022	01858	
Timber rafting + (Note: Shared with Austria, Czechia, Latvia, Poland, and Spain.)		2022	01866	Timber rafting is a method of transporting felled tree trunks by tying them together to make rafts, which are then drifted or pulled downriver, or across a lake or other body of water.
Knowledge, craft and skills of handmade glass production + (Note: Shared with Czechia, Finland, France, Hungary, and Spain.)		2023	01961	
Midwifery: knowledge, skills and practices + (Note: Shared with Colombia, Cyprus, Kyrgyzstan, Luxembourg, Nigeria, Slovenia, and Togo.)		2023	01968	A midwife is a health professional who cares for mothers and newborns.
Traditional irrigation: knowledge, technique, and organization + (Note: Shared with Austria, Belgium, Italy, Luxembourg, Netherlands, and Switzerland.)		2023	01979	

=== Good Safeguarding Practices ===
Name	Year	No.	Description
Craft techniques and customary practices of cathedral workshops, or Bauhütten, in Europe, know-how, transmission, development of knowledge and innovation + (Note: Shared with Austria, France, Norway, and Switzerland.)	2020	01558	A Bauhütten (cathedral workshop), is a structure dedicated to the construction, maintenance and restoration of a monument with a specific mode of operation, known as Bauhüttenwesen.

== See also ==
- List of World Heritage Sites in Germany
