= Lists of Intangible Cultural Heritage elements =

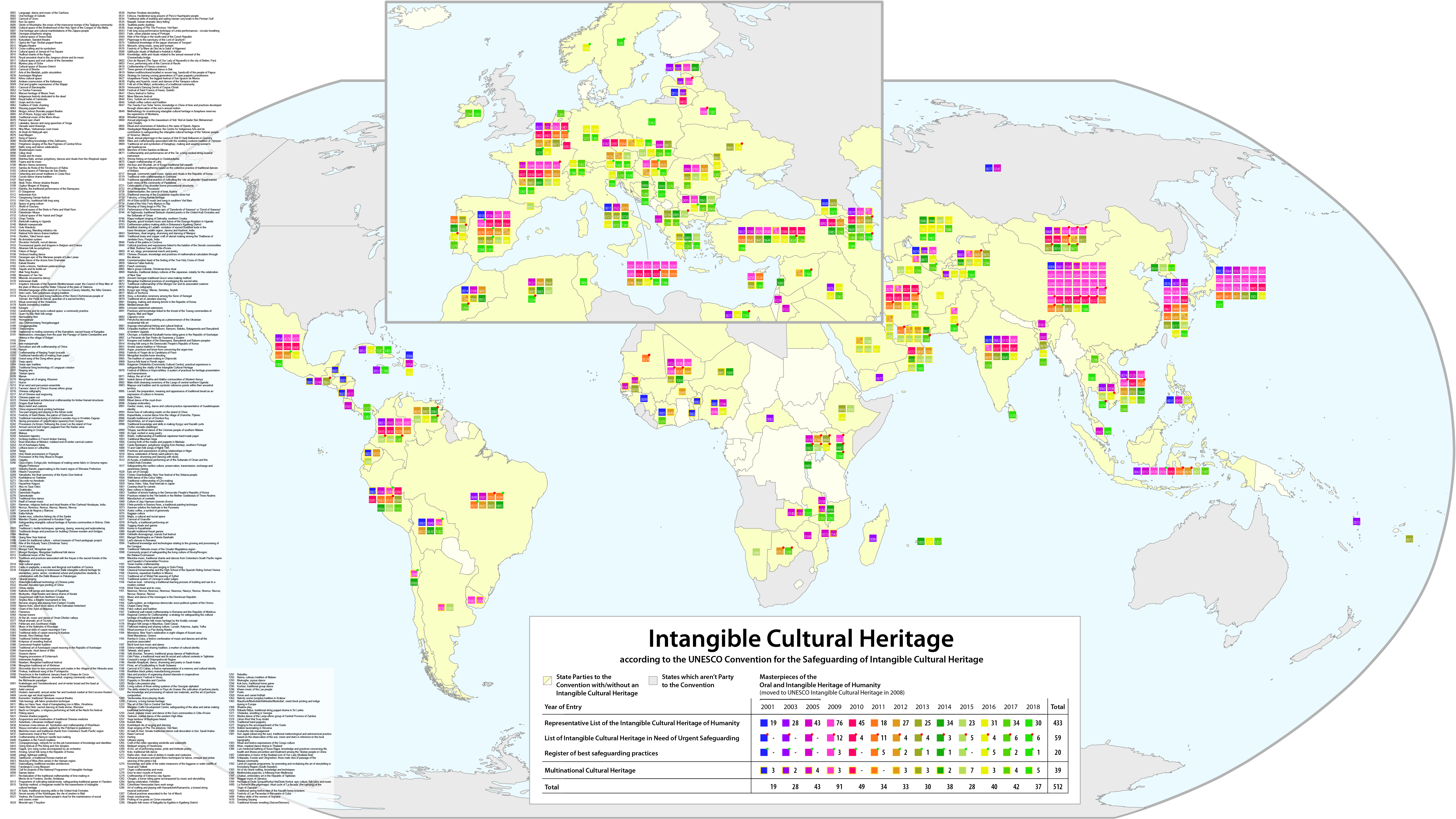
Distribution by country as of 2018

UNESCO established its Lists of Intangible Cultural Heritage with the aim of ensuring better protection of important intangible cultural heritages worldwide and the awareness of their significance. This list is published by the Intergovernmental Committee for the Safeguarding of Intangible Cultural Heritage, the members of which are elected by State Parties meeting in a General Assembly. Through a compendium of the different oral and intangible treasures of humankind worldwide, the programme aims to draw attention to the importance of safeguarding intangible heritage, which UNESCO has identified as an essential component and as a repository of cultural diversity and of creative expression.

The list was established in 2008 when the 2003 Convention for the Safeguarding of the Intangible Cultural Heritage took effect.

As of 2010, the programme compiles three lists. The longer Representative List of the Intangible Cultural Heritage of Humanity comprises cultural "practices and expressions [that] help demonstrate the diversity of this heritage and raise awareness about its importance." The shorter List of Intangible Cultural Heritage in Need of Urgent Safeguarding is composed of those cultural elements that concerned communities and countries consider to require urgent measures to keep them alive. The third list is the Register of Good Safeguarding Practices.

In 2013, four elements were inscribed on the List of Intangible Cultural Heritage in Need of Urgent Safeguarding, which helps States Parties mobilize international cooperation and assistance to ensure the transmission of this heritage with the participation of the concerned communities. The Urgent Safeguarding List now numbers 35 elements. The Intergovernmental Committee also inscribed 25 elements on the Representative List of the Intangible Cultural Heritage of Humanity, which serves to raise awareness of intangible heritage and provide recognition to communities' traditions and know-how that reflect their cultural diversity. The list does not attribute or recognize any standard of excellence or exclusivity. All lists combined totalled 676 elements, corresponding to 140 countries as of April 2023.

Elements inscribed in the lists are deemed significant manifestations of humanity's intangible heritage, the highest honour for intangible heritage on a global level.

== Representative List of the Intangible Cultural Heritage of Humanity ==
The Representative List of the Intangible Cultural Heritage of Humanity contains intangible cultural heritage elements that "help demonstrate the diversity of cultural heritage and raise awareness about its importance".

Member state	Element^{[A]}	Year proclaimed^{[B]}	Year inscribed^{[C]}	Region^{[D]}	Ref.
Afghanistan	Behzad's style of miniature art		2025	APA	
Afghanistan; Azerbaijan; India; Iran; Iraq; Kazakhstan; Kyrgyzstan; Mongolia; Pakistan; Tajikistan; Turkey; Turkmenistan; Uzbekistan	Nawrouz, Novruz, Nowrouz, Nowrouz, Nawrouz, Nauryz, Nooruz, Nowruz, Navruz, Nevruz, Nowruz, Navruz		2024	APA	
Afghanistan; Azerbaijan; Iran; Turkey; Tajikistan; Turkmenistan; Uzbekistan	Sericulture and traditional production of silk for weaving		2022	APA	
Afghanistan; Iran	Yaldā/Chella		2022	APA	
Afghanistan; Iran; Tajikistan; Uzbekistan	Art of crafting and playing rubab/rabab		2024	APA	
Albania	Iso-Polyphony	2005	2008	ENA	
Albania	K'cimi dancing of Tropojë		2024	ENA	
Albania; Andorra; Austria; Croatia; France; Greece; Italy; Luxembourg; Romania; Spain	Transhumance, the seasonal droving of livestock		2023	ENA	
Algeria	Ritual and ceremonies of Sebiba in the oasis of Djanet, Algeria		2014	AST	
Algeria	Ahellil of Gourara	2005	2008	AST	
Algeria	Rites and craftsmanship associated with the wedding costume tradition of Tlemcen		2012	AST	
Algeria	Annual pilgrimage to the mausoleum of Sidi 'Abd el-Qader Ben Mohammed (Sidi Cheikh)		2017	AST	
Algeria	Sbuâ, annual pilgrimage to the zawiya of Sidi El Hadj Belkacem in Gourara		2015	AST	
Algeria	Raï, popular folk song of Algeria		2022	AST	
Algeria	The women’s ceremonial costume in the Eastern region of Algeria: knowledge and skills associated with the making and adornment of the ‘Gandoura’ and the ‘Melehfa’		2024	AST	
Algeria; Mali; Niger	Practices and knowledge linked to the Imzad of the Tuareg communities of Algeria, Mali and Niger		2013	AFR, AST	
Algeria; Mauritania; Morocco; Tunisia	Couscous, Maghrebi cuisine		2020	AFR, AST	
Algeria; Egypt; Iraq; Mauritania; Morocco; Palestine; Saudi Arabia; Sudan; Tunisia; Yemen	Arts, skills and practices associated with engraving on metals (gold, silver and copper)		2023	AST	
Andorra; Austria; Belgium; Croatia; Cyprus; France; Greece; Italy; Slovenia; Spain; Switzerland; Ireland; Luxembourg	Art of dry stone construction, knowledge and techniques		2024	ENA	
Andorra; France; Spain	Summer solstice fire festivals in the Pyrenees		2015	ENA	
Andorra; France	Bear festivities in the Pyrenees		2022	ENA	
Angola	Sona, drawings and geometric figures on sand		2023	AFR	
Argentina	Filete porteño in Buenos Aires, a traditional painting technique		2015	LAC	
Argentina	Chamamé		2020	LAC	
Argentina	Cuarteto: music, dance and lyrics in the city of Córdoba, Argentina		2025	LAC	
Argentina; Uruguay	Tango		2009	LAC	
Armenia	Duduk and its music	2005	2008	ENA	
Armenia	Armenian cross-stones art. Symbolism and craftsmanship of Khachkars		2010	ENA	
Armenia	Performance of the Armenian epic of 'Daredevils of Sassoun' or 'David of Sassoun'		2012	ENA	
Armenia	Lavash, the preparation, meaning and appearance of traditional bread as an expression of culture in Armenia		2014	ENA	
Armenia	Kochari, traditional group dance		2017	ENA	
Armenia	Armenian letter art and its cultural expressions		2019	ENA	
Armenia	Tradition of blacksmithing in Gyumri		2023	ENA	
Armenia; Iran	Pilgrimage to the St. Thaddeus Apostle Monastery		2020	APA	
Austria	Schemenlaufen, the carnival of Imst, Austria		2012	ENA	
Austria	Classical horsemanship and the High School of the Spanish Riding School Vienna		2015	ENA	
Austria; Belgium; Croatia; Czech Republic; France; Germany; Hungary; Ireland; Italy; Kazakhstan; South Korea; Kyrgyzstan; Mongolia; Netherlands; Morocco; Pakistan; Poland; Portugal; Qatar; Saudi Arabia; Slovakia; Spain; Syria; United Arab Emirates	Falconry, a living human heritage		2021	AFR, APA, AST, ENA	
Austria; Belgium; Germany; Italy; Luxembourg; Netherlands; Switzerland	Traditional irrigation: knowledge, technique, and organization		2023	ENA	
Austria; Bosnia and Herzegovina; Croatia; Hungary; Italy; Romania; Slovakia; Slovenia	Lipizzan horse breeding traditions		2022	ENA	
Austria; Czech Republic; Germany; Hungary; Slovakia	Blaudruck/Modrotisk/Kékfestés/Modrotlač, resist block printing and indigo dyeing in Europe		2018	ENA	
Austria; Czech Republic; Germany; Latvia; Poland; Spain	Timber rafting		2022	ENA	
Austria; Greece; Italy; Romania	Transhumance, the seasonal droving of livestock along migratory routes in the Mediterranean and in the Alps		2019	ENA	
Austria; Switzerland	Avalanche risk management		2018	ENA	
Azerbaijan	Azerbaijani Mugham	2003	2008	ENA	
Azerbaijan	Art of Azerbaijani Ashiq		2009	ENA	
Azerbaijan	Traditional art of Azerbaijani carpet weaving in the Republic of Azerbaijan		2010	ENA	
Azerbaijan	Craftsmanship and performance art of the Tar, a long-necked string musical instrument		2012	ENA	
Azerbaijan	Traditional art and symbolism of Kelaghayi, making and wearing women's silk headscarves		2014	ENA	
Azerbaijan	Copper craftsmanship of Lahij		2015	ENA	
Azerbaijan	Dolma making and sharing tradition, a marker of cultural identity		2017	ENA	
Azerbaijan	Nar Bayrami, traditional pomegranate festivity and culture		2020	ENA	
Azerbaijan	Pehlevanliq culture: traditional zorkhana games, sports and wrestling		2022	ENA	
Azerbaijan	Tandir craftsmanship and bread baking in Azerbaijan		2024	ENA	
Azerbaijan; Iran	Art of crafting and playing with Kamantcheh/Kamancha, a bowed string musical instrument		2017	APA	
Azerbaijan; Iran; Tajikistan; Turkey; Uzbekistan	Art of illumination: Təzhib/Tazhib/Zarhalkori/Tezhip/Naqqoshlik		2023	APA	
Azerbaijan; Iran; Turkey; Uzbekistan	Art of miniature		2020	APA	
Azerbaijan; Iran; Turkey; Uzbekistan	Iftar/Eftari/Iftar/Iftor and its socio-cultural traditions		2023	APA	
Azerbaijan; Iran; Kazakhstan; Kyrgyzstan; Turkey	Flatbread making and sharing culture: Lavash, Katyrma, Jupka, Yufka		2016	APA	
Azerbaijan; Kazakhstan; Kyrgyzstan; Tajikistan; Turkey; Turkmenistan; Uzbekistan	Telling tradition of Nasreddin Hodja/ Molla Nesreddin/ Molla Ependi/ Apendi/ Afendi Kozhanasyr Anecdotes		2022	APA	
Azerbaijan; Kazakhstan; Turkey	Heritage of Dede Qorqud/Korkyt Ata/Dede Korkut, epic culture, folk tales and music		2018	APA	
Azerbaijan; Turkey	Culture of Çay (tea), a symbol of identity, hospitality and social interaction		2022	APA	
Azerbaijan; Turkey	Craftsmanship and performing art of balaban/mey		2023	APA	
Azerbaijan; Turkey	Craftsmanship of mother of pearl inlay		2023	APA	
Bahamas	Junkanoo		2023	LAC	
Bahrain	Fjiri		2021	AST	
Bahrain; Egypt; Iraq; Jordan; Kuwait; Mauritania; Morocco; Oman; Palestine; Saudi Arabia; Sudan; Tunisia; United Arab Emirates; Yemen	Date palm, knowledge, skills, traditions and practices		2019	AST	
Bahrain; Egypt; Iraq; Jordan; Kuwait; Mauritania; Morocco; Oman; Palestine; Saudi Arabia; Sudan; Tunisia; United Arab Emirates; Yemen	Date palm, knowledge, skills, traditions and practices		2022	AST	
Bahrain; Iraq; Jordan; Kuwait; Oman; Saudi Arabia; Syria; United Arab Emirates	Bisht (men's Abaa): skills and practices		2025	AST	
Bangladesh	Baul songs	2005	2008	APA	
Bangladesh	Traditional art of Jamdani weaving		2013	APA	
Bangladesh	Mangal Shobhajatra on Pahela Baishakh		2016	APA	
Bangladesh	Traditional art of Shital Pati weaving of Sylhet		2017	APA	
Bangladesh	Rickshaws & Rickshaw painting in Dhaka		2023	APA	
Bangladesh	Traditional Saree weaving art of Tangail		2025	APA	
Belarus	Annual celebration in honor of Our Lady of Budslau		2018	ENA	
Belarus	Straw weaving in Belarus, art, craft and skills		2022	ENA	
Belarus	Vytsinanka, traditional art of paper cutting in Belarus		2024	ENA	
Belarus	Negliubka textile tradition of Vetka District Gomel Region		2025	ENA	
Belarus; Poland	Tree beekeeping culture		2020	ENA	
Belgium	Carnival of Binche	2003	2008	ENA	
Belgium	Procession of the Holy Blood in Bruges		2009	ENA	
Belgium	Houtem Jaarmarkt, annual winter fair and livestock market at Sint-Lievens-Houtem		2010	ENA	
Belgium	Krakelingen and Tonnekensbrand, end-of-winter bread and fire feast at Geraardsbergen		2010	ENA	
Belgium	Leuven age set ritual repertoire		2011	ENA	
Belgium	Marches of Entre-Sambre-et-Meuse		2012	ENA	
Belgium	Shrimp fishing on horseback in Oostduinkerke		2013	ENA	
Belgium	Beer culture in Belgium		2016	ENA	
Belgium	Ommegang of Brussels, an annual historical procession and popular festival		2019	ENA	
Belgium	Namur stilt jousting		2021	ENA	
Belgium	Brussels' rod marionette tradition		2025	ENA	
Belgium; France	Processional giants and dragons in Belgium and France	2005	2008	ENA	
Belgium; France	Funfair culture		2024	ENA	
Belgium; France; Italy; Luxembourg	Musical art of horn players, an instrumental technique linked to singing, breath control, vibrato, resonance of place and conviviality		2020	ENA	
Belize	Christmas Bram and Sambai of Gales Point Manatee, Belize		2025	LAC	
Belize; Guatemala; Honduras; Nicaragua	Language, dance and music of the Garifuna	2001	2008	LAC	
Benin; Nigeria; Togo	Oral heritage of Gelede	2001	2008	AFR	
Bhutan	Mask dance of the drums from Drametse	2005	2008	APA	
Bolivia	Andean cosmovision of the Kallawaya	2003	2008	LAC	
Bolivia	Carnival of Oruro	2001	2008	LAC	
Bolivia	Ichapekene Piesta, the biggest festival of San Ignacio de Moxos		2012	LAC	
Bolivia	Pujllay and Ayarichi, music and dances of the Yampara culture		2014	LAC	
Bolivia	Ritual journeys in La Paz during Alasita		2017	LAC	
Bolivia	The festival of the Santísima Trinidad del Señor Jesús del Gran Poder in the city of La Paz		2019	LAC	
Bolivia	Grand Festival of Tarija		2021	LAC	
Bolivia	Ch'utillos, the Festival of San Bartolomé and San Ignacio de Loyola, the meeting of cultures in Potosí		2023	LAC	
Bolivia	Festivity of the Virgen of Guadalupe – Patroness of Sucre		2025	LAC	
Bosnia and Herzegovina	Zmijanje embroidery		2014	ENA	
Bosnia and Herzegovina	Konjic woodcarving		2017	ENA	
Bosnia and Herzegovina	Picking of iva grass on Ozren mountain		2018	ENA	
Bosnia and Herzegovina	Grass mowing competition custom in Kupres		2020	ENA	
Bosnia and Herzegovina	Sevdalinka, traditional urban folk song		2024	ENA	
Brazil	Oral and graphic expressions of the Wajapi	2003	2008	LAC	
Brazil	Samba de Roda of the Recôncavo of Bahia	2005	2008	LAC	
Brazil	Frevo, performing arts of the Carnival of Recife		2012	LAC	
Brazil	Círio de Nazaré (The Taper of Our Lady of Nazareth) in the city of Belém, Pará		2013	LAC	
Brazil	Capoeira circle		2014	LAC	
Brazil	Cultural Complex of Bumba-meu-boi from Maranhão		2019	LAC	
Brazil	Traditional ways of making Artisan Minas Cheese in Minas Gerais		2024	LAC	
Brunei; Indonesia; Malaysia	Pantun		2025	APA	
Brunei; Indonesia; Malaysia; Singapore; Thailand	Kebaya: knowledge, skills, traditions and practices		2024	APA	
Bulgaria	Bistritsa Babi, archaic polyphony, dances and rituals from the Shoplouk region	2005	2008	ENA	
Bulgaria	Nestinarstvo, messages from the past: the Panagyr of Saints Constantine and Helena in the village of Bulgari		2009	ENA	
Bulgaria	The tradition of carpet-making in Chiprovtsi		2014	ENA	
Bulgaria	Surva folk feast in Pernik region		2015	ENA	
Bulgaria	Visoko multipart singing from Dolen and Satovcha, South-western Bulgaria		2021	ENA	
Bulgaria	Bagpipes and bagpipe playing in Bulgaria: transmission of knowledge and skills		2025	ENA	
Bulgaria; North Macedonia; Moldova; Romania	Cultural practices associated with 1 March, called Martenitsa in Bulgaria, Martinka in North Macedonia and Mărțișor in Romania.		2017	ENA	
Burundi	Ritual dance of the royal drum		2014	AFR	
Cameroon; Congo; Gabon	Mvet Oyeng, musical art, practices and skills associated with the Ekang community		2025	AFR	
Cape Verde	Morna, musical practice of Cabo Verde		2019	AFR	
Cambodia	Royal ballet of Cambodia	2003	2008	APA	
Cambodia	Sbek Thom, Khmer shadow theatre	2005	2008	APA	
Cambodia	Kun Lbokator, traditional martial arts in Cambodia		2022	APA	
Cambodia	Cultural practices and expressions linked to Krama, a traditional woven textile in Cambodia		2024	APA	
Cambodia; Philippines; South Korea; Vietnam	Tugging rituals and games		2015	APA	
Cameroon	Nguon, rituals of governance and associated expressions in the Bamoun community		2023	AFR	
Cameroon	Ngondo, worship of water oracles and associated cultural traditions among the Sawa		2024	AFR	
Central African Republic	Polyphonic singing of the Aka Pygmies of Central Africa	2003	2008	AFR	
Chad; Cameroon	Guruna, a practice of pastoral, socio-cultural and artistic retreats centered on livestock among the Massa		2025	AFR	
Chile	Baile Chino		2014	LAC	
Chile	Family tradition circus in Chile		2025	LAC	
China	Kun Qu opera	2001	2008	APA	
China	Guqin and its music	2003	2008	APA	
China	Uyghur Muqam of Xinjiang	2005	2008	APA	
China	Art of Chinese seal engraving		2009	APA	
China	China engraved block printing technique		2009	APA	
China	Chinese calligraphy		2009	APA	
China	Chinese paper-cut		2009	APA	
China	Chinese traditional architectural craftsmanship for timber-framed structures		2009	APA	
China	Craftsmanship of Nanjing yunjin brocade		2009	APA	
China	Dragon Boat festival		2009	APA	
China	Pungmul (Farmers' dance of China's Korean ethnic group)		2009	APA	
China	Gesar epic tradition		2009	APA	
China	Grand song of the Dong ethnic group		2009	APA	
China	Hua'er		2009	APA	
China	Manas		2009	APA	
China	Mazu belief and customs		2009	APA	
China	Nanyin		2009	APA	
China	Regong arts		2009	APA	
China	Sericulture and silk craftsmanship of China		2009	APA	
China	Tibetan opera		2009	APA	
China	Traditional firing technology of Longquan celadon		2009	APA	
China	Traditional handicrafts of making Xuan paper		2009	APA	
China	Xi'an wind and percussion ensemble		2009	APA	
China	Yueju opera		2009	APA	
China	Acupuncture and moxibustion of traditional Chinese medicine		2010	APA	
China	Peking opera		2010	APA	
China	Chinese shadow puppetry		2011	APA	
China	Pit courtyard construction techniques (Dikengyuan construction techniques, Northern Shaanxi cave dwelling construction techniques)		2011	APA	
China	Chinese Zhusuan, knowledge and practices of mathematical calculation through the abacus		2013	APA	
China	The Twenty-Four Solar Terms, knowledge of time and practices developed in China through observation of the sun's annual motion		2016	APA	
China	Lum medicinal bathing of Sowa Rigpa, knowledge and practices concerning life, health and illness prevention and treatment among the Tibetan people in China		2018	APA	
China	Taijiquan		2020	APA	
China	Traditional tea processing techniques and associated social practices in China		2022	APA	
China	Qiang New Year Festival		2024	APA	
China	Spring festival, social practices of the Chinese people in celebration of traditional new year		2024	APA	
China	Traditional design and practices for building Chinese wooden arch bridges		2024	APA	
China	Traditional Li textile techniques: spinning, dyeing, weaving and embroidering		2024	APA	
China	Hezhen Yimakan storytelling		2025	APA	
China; Mongolia	Mongolian Urtiin Duu – Traditional Folk Long Song	2005	2008	APA	
China; Malaysia	Ong Chun/Wangchuan/Wangkang ceremony, rituals and related practices for maintaining the sustainable connection between man and the ocean		2020	APA	
Colombia	Carnival of Barranquilla	2003	2008	LAC	
Colombia	Cultural space of Palenque de San Basilio	2005	2008	LAC	
Colombia	Carnaval de Negros y Blancos		2009	LAC	
Colombia	Holy Week processions in Popayán		2009	LAC	
Colombia	Wayuu normative system, applied by the Pütchipü'üi (palabrero)		2010	LAC	
Colombia	Traditional knowledge of the jaguar shamans of Yuruparí		2011	LAC	
Colombia	Festival of Saint Francis of Assisi, Quibdó		2012	LAC	
Colombia	Ancestral system of knowledge of the four indigenous peoples, Arhuaco, Kankuamo, Kogui and Wiwa of the Sierra Nevada de Santa Marta		2022	LAC	
Colombia	Living pictures of Galeras, Sucre		2024	LAC	
Colombia; Cyprus; Germany; Kyrgyzstan; Luxembourg; Nigeria; Slovenia; Togo	Midwifery: knowledge, skills and practices		2023	LAC, ENA, AST, AFR	
Colombia; Ecuador	Marimba music, traditional chants and dances from the Colombia South Pacific region and Esmeraldas Province of Ecuador		2015	LAC	
Comoros; Djibouti; Iraq; Jordan; Mauritania; Somalia; United Arab Emirates	The zaffa in the traditional wedding		2025	APA	
Costa Rica	Oxherding and oxcart traditions in Costa Rica	2005	2008	LAC	
Ivory Coast	Gbofe of Afounkaha, the music of the transverse trumps of the Tagbana community	2001	2008	AFR	
Ivory Coast	Zaouli, popular music and dance of the Guro communities in Côte d'Ivoire		2017	AFR	
Ivory Coast	Traditional skills of loincloth weaving in Côte d’Ivoire		2023	AFR	
Ivory Coast	Skills related to Attiéké production in Côte d’Ivoire		2024	AFR	
Croatia	Zvončari, annual carnival bell ringers' pageant from the Kastav area		2009	ENA	
Croatia	Festivity of Saint Blaise, the patron of Dubrovnik		2009	ENA	
Croatia	Lacemaking in Croatia		2009	ENA	
Croatia	Procession Za Krizen ('following the cross') on the island of Hvar		2009	ENA	
Croatia	Spring procession of Ljelje/Kraljice (queens) from Gorjani		2009	ENA	
Croatia	Traditional manufacturing of children's wooden toys in Hrvatsko Zagorje		2009	ENA	
Croatia	Two-part singing and playing in the Istrian scale		2009	ENA	
Croatia	Gingerbread craft from Northern Croatia		2010	ENA	
Croatia	Sinjska alka, a knights' tournament in Sinj		2010	ENA	
Croatia	Bećarac singing and playing from Eastern Croatia		2011	ENA	
Croatia	Nijemo Kolo, silent circle dance of the Dalmatian hinterland		2011	ENA	
Croatia	Klapa multipart singing of Dalmatia, southern Croatia		2012	ENA	
Croatia	Međimurska popevka, a folksong from Međimurje		2018	ENA	
Croatia	Festivity of Saint Tryphon and the Kolo (chain dance) of Saint Tryphon, traditions of Croats from Boka Kotorska (Bay of Kotor) who live in the Republic of Croatia		2022	ENA	
Croatia; Cyprus; Greece; Italy; Morocco; Portugal; Spain	Mediterranean diet (In 2010, Italy, Spain, Greece and Morocco were the first to be recognised, but on 4 December 2013, Portugal, Cyprus and Croatia were also recognised by UNESCO.)		2013	ENA, AFR	
Cuba	La Tumba Francesa, a secular Afro-Cuban genre of dance, song, and drumming	2003	2008	LAC	
Cuba	Rumba in Cuba, a festive combination of music and dances and all the practices associated		2016	LAC	
Cuba	Punto		2017	LAC	
Cuba	Festivity of Las Parrandas in the centre of Cuba		2018	LAC	
Cuba	Knowledge of the light rum masters		2022	LAC	
Cuba	The practice of Cuban Son		2025	LAC	
Cuba; Dominican Republic; Haiti; Honduras; Venezuela	Traditional knowledge and practices for the making and consumption of cassava bread		2024	LAC	
Cuba; Mexico	Bolero: identity, emotion and poetry turned into song		2023	LAC	
Cyprus	Lefkara laces or Lefkaritika		2009	ENA	
Cyprus	Tsiattista poetic duelling		2011	ENA	
Cyprus	Commandaria wine		2025	ENA	
Cyprus; Greece	Byzantine chant		2019	ENA	
Czech Republic	Slovácko Verbuňk, recruit dances	2005	2008	ENA	
Czech Republic	Shrovetide door-to-door processions and masks in the villages of the Hlinecko area		2010	ENA	
Czech Republic	Ride of the Kings in the south-east of the Czech Republic		2011	ENA	
Czech Republic	Handmade production of Christmas tree decorations from blown glass beads in Poniklá, Giant Mountains area		2020	ENA	
Czech Republic	Amateur theatre acting in Czechia		2025	ENA	
Czech Republic; Finland; France; Germany; Hungary; Spain	Knowledge, craft and skills of handmade glass production		2023	ENA	
Czech Republic; Slovakia	Puppetry in Slovakia and Czechia		2016	ENA	
Democratic Republic of the Congo; Congo	Congolese rumba		2021	AFR	
Denmark	Inuit drum dancing and singing		2021	ENA	
Denmark; Finland; Iceland; Norway; Sweden	Nordic clinker boat traditions		2021	ENA	
Dominican Republic	Cultural Space of the Brotherhood of the Holy Spirit of the Congos of Villa Mella	2001	2008	LAC	
Dominican Republic	Cocolo Dance Drama Tradition	2005	2008	LAC	
Dominican Republic	Music and dance of the merengue		2016	LAC	
Dominican Republic	Music and dance of Bachata		2019	LAC	
Ecuador	Traditional weaving of the Ecuadorian toquilla straw hat		2012	LAC	
Ecuador	Pasillo, song and poetry		2021	LAC	
Ecuador; Peru	Oral heritage and cultural manifestations of the Zápara people	2001	2008	LAC	
Egypt	The Al-Sirah Al-Hilaliyyah Epic	2003	2008	AST	
Egypt	Tahteeb, stick game		2016	AST	
Egypt	Festivals related to the Journey of the Holy family in Egypt		2022	AST	
Egypt	Koshary, daily life dish and practices associated with it		2025	AST	
Egypt; Saudi Arabia	Semsemiah: instrument crafting and playing		2024	AST	
El Salvador	The Confraternity of flowers and palms		2025	LAC	
Estonia	Kihnu cultural space	2003	2008	ENA	
Estonia	Seto Leelo, Seto polyphonic singing tradition		2009	ENA	
Estonia	Smoke sauna tradition in Võromaa		2014	ENA	
Estonia	Cooking and eating Mulgi puder, traditional mashed potato with barley in the Mulgimaa region, Estonia		2024	ENA	
Estonia; Latvia; Lithuania	Baltic (Estonian, Latvian and Lithuanian) song and dance celebrations	2003	2008	ENA	
Ethiopia	Commemoration feast of the finding of the True Holy Cross of Christ		2013	AFR	
Ethiopia	Fichee-Chambalaalla, New Year festival of the Sidama people		2015	AFR	
Ethiopia	Gada system, an indigenous democratic socio-political system of the Oromo		2016	AFR	
Ethiopia	Ethiopian epiphany		2019	AFR	
Ethiopia	Shuwalid festival		2023	AFR	
Ethiopia	Gifaataa, Welayta people New Year festival		2025	AFR	
Ethiopia; Djibouti; Somalia	Xeer Ciise: Oral customary laws of Somali-Issa communities in Ethiopia, Djibouti and Somalia		2024	AFR	
Finland	Sauna culture in Finland		2020	ENA	
Finland	Kaustinen fiddle playing and related practices and expressions		2021	ENA	
France	Aubusson tapestry		2009	ENA	
France	Maloya		2009	ENA	
France	Scribing tradition in French timber framing		2009	ENA	
France	Compagnonnage, network for on-the-job transmission of knowledge and identities		2010	ENA	
France	Craftsmanship of Alençon needle lace-making		2010	ENA	
France	Gastronomic meal of the French		2010	ENA	
France	Equitation in the French tradition		2011	ENA	
France	Fest-Noz, festive gathering based on the collective practice of traditional dances of Brittany		2012	ENA	
France	Limousin septennial ostensions		2013	ENA	
France	Gwoka: music, song, dance and cultural practice representative of Guadeloupean identity		2014	ENA	
France	Carnival of Granville		2016	ENA	
France	The skills related to perfume in Pays de Grasse: the cultivation of perfume plants, the knowledge and processing of natural raw materials, and the art of perfume composition		2018	ENA	
France	Artisanal know-how and culture of baguette bread		2022	ENA	
France	Skills of Parisian zinc roofers and ornamentalists		2024	ENA	
France; Italy	The art of glass beads		2020	ENA	
France; Italy; Switzerland	Alpinism		2019	ENA	
France; Switzerland	Craftsmanship of mechanical watchmaking and art mechanics		2020	ENA	
Gambia; Senegal	Kankurang, Manding initiatory rite	2005	2008	AFR	
Georgia	Georgian polyphonic singing	2001	2008	ENA	
Georgia	Ancient Georgian traditional Qvevri wine-making method		2013	ENA	
Georgia	Living culture of three writing systems of the Georgian alphabet		2016	ENA	
Georgia	Chidaoba, wrestling in Georgia		2018	ENA	
Georgia	Georgian wheat culture: traditions and rituals		2025	ENA	
Germany	Idea and practice of organizing shared interests in cooperatives		2016	ENA	
Germany	Organ craftsmanship and music		2017	ENA	
Germany	The practice of Modern Dance in Germany		2022	ENA	
Ghana	Craftsmanship of traditional woven textile Kente		2024	AFR	
Ghana	Highlife music and dance		2025	AFR	
Greece	Know-how of cultivating mastic on the island of Chios		2014	ENA	
Greece	Tinian marble craftsmanship		2015	ENA	
Greece	Momoeria, New Year's celebration in eight villages of Kozani area, West Macedonia, Greece		2016	ENA	
Greece	Rebetiko		2017	ENA	
Greece	August 15th (Dekapentavgoustos) festivities in two Highland Communities of Northern Greece: Tranos Choros (Grand Dance) in Vlasti and Syrrako Festival		2022	ENA	
Greece	Messosporitissa Festivity (All-holy Mother of God of the Mid-Sowing Season Festivity), Feast of Our Lady at the Ancient Ruins		2024	ENA	
Grenada	Traditional wooden boatbuilding in Carriacou and Petite Martinique		2023	LAC	
Grenada	Shakespeare Mas', a traditional component of Carriacou's annual carnival		2024	LAC	
Guatemala	Rabinal Achí dance drama tradition	2005	2008	LAC	
Guatemala	Holy Week in Guatemala		2022	LAC	
Guatemala	Technique of making the giant kites of Santiago Sacatepéquez and Sumpango, Guatemala		2024	LAC	
Guinea	Cultural space of Sosso-Bala	2001	2008	AFR	
Haiti	Joumou soup		2021	LAC	
Haiti	The Compas of Haiti		2025	LAC	
Hungary	Busó festivities at Mohács: masked end-of-winter carnival custom		2009	ENA	
Hungary	Matyó embroidery, embroidery of a traditional community		2012	ENA	
Hungary	Hungarian string band tradition		2022	ENA	
Hungary	Csárdás dance tradition		2024	ENA	
Iceland	Swimming pool culture in Iceland		2025	ENA	
India	Koodiyattam: a Sanskrit theatre of Kerala	2001	2008	APA	
India	Vedic chanting: recitation of sacred Hindu texts	2003	2008	APA	
India	Ramlila: the traditional performance of the Ramayana	2005	2008	APA	
India	Ramman: a religious festival and ritual theatre of Garhwal, Uttarakhand		2009	APA	
India	Chhau dance: a classical dance form of West Bengal, Jharkhand and Odisha.		2010	APA	
India	Kalbelia: folk songs and dances of Rajasthan		2010	APA	
India	Mudiyett: a ritual theatre and dance drama of Kerala		2010	APA	
India	Ladakh Buddhist chantings: recitation of sacred Buddhist texts in Ladakh		2012	APA	
India	Manipuri Sankirtana: a ritual singing, drumming and dancing of Manipur		2013	APA	
India	Traditional brass and copper craft of utensil making among the Thatheras of Jandiala Guru, Punjab		2014	APA	
India	Yoga: ancient Indian physical, mental and spiritual practices		2016	APA	
India	Kumbh Mela: mass Hindu pilgrimage held at Haridwar of Uttarakhand, Nashik of Maharashtra, Prayagraj of Uttar Pradesh and Ujjain of Madhya Pradesh		2017	APA	
India	Durga Puja in Kolkata: a religious festival of Hindu Goddess Durga in Kolkata, West Bengal		2021	APA	
India	Garba of Gujarat		2023	APA	
India	Deepavali: a light festival celebrated annually across India, that marks the last harvest of the year and the start of a new year and new season		2025	APA	
Indonesia	Wayang puppet theatre	2003	2008	APA	
Indonesia	Kris	2005	2008	APA	
Indonesia	Batik		2009	APA	
Indonesia	Angklung		2010	APA	
Indonesia	Three genres of traditional dance in Bali		2015	APA	
Indonesia	Pinisi, art of boatbuilding in South Sulawesi		2017	APA	
Indonesia	Traditions of Pencak Silat		2019	APA	
Indonesia	Gamelan		2021	APA	
Indonesia	Jamu wellness culture		2023	APA	
Iran	Radif of Iranian music		2009	APA	
Iran	Traditional skills of carpet weaving in Kashan		2010	APA	
Iran	Traditional skills of carpet weaving in Fars		2010	APA	
Iran	Ritual dramatic art of Ta'zīye		2010	APA	
Iran	Pahlevani and Zoorkhanei rituals		2010	APA	
Iran	Music of the Bakhshis of Khorasan		2010	APA	
Iran	Qālišuyān rituals of Mašhad-e Ardehāl in Kāšān		2012	APA	
Iran	Chogān, a horse-riding game accompanied by music and storytelling		2017	APA	
Iran	Traditional skills of crafting and playing Dotār		2019	APA	
Iran	Ayeneh-Kari, the art of mirror-work in Persian architecture		2025	APA	
Iran; Syria	Crafting and playing the Oud		2022	APA, AST	
Iran; Tajikistan	Sadeh/Sada celebration		2023	APA	
Iran; Tajikistan	Ceremony of Mehregan		2024	APA	
Iraq	The Iraqi Maqam	2003	2008	AST	
Iraq	Provision of services and hospitality during the Arba'een visitation		2019	AST	
Iraq	Traditional craft skills and arts of Al-Naoor		2021	AST	
Iraq	Traditional craft skills and arts of Al-Mudhif building		2023	AST	
Iraq	Al-Muhaibis: social practices and traditions associated with it		2025	AST	
Iraq; Jordan; Libya; Oman; Palestine; Saudi Arabia; Syria; Tunisia; United Arab Emirates	Arabic Kohl		2025	AST	
Ireland	Uilleann piping		2017	ENA	
Ireland	Camogie		2018	ENA	
Ireland	Hurling		2018	ENA	
Ireland	Irish harping		2019	ENA	
Italy	Opera dei Pupi, Sicilian Puppet Theatre	2001	2008	ENA	
Italy	Canto a tenore, Sardinian Pastoral Songs	2005	2008	ENA	
Italy	Traditional violin craftsmanship in Cremona		2012	ENA	
Italy	Celebrations of big shoulder-borne processional structures		2013	ENA	
Italy	Traditional agricultural practice of cultivating the "vite ad alberello" (head-trained bush vines) of the community of Pantelleria		2014	ENA	
Italy	Art of Neapolitan 'Pizzaiuolo'		2017	ENA	
Italy	Celestinian forgiveness celebration		2019	ENA	
Italy	Truffle hunting and extraction in Italy, traditional knowledge and practice		2021	ENA	
Italy	The practice of opera singing in Italy		2023	ENA	
Italy	Italian cooking, between sustainability and biocultural diversity		2025	ENA	
Jamaica	The Maroon Heritage of Moore Town	2003	2008	LAC	
Jamaica	Reggae music of Jamaica		2018	LAC	
Jamaica	Pilgrimage to Watt Town		2024	LAC	
Japan	Nôgaku Theatre	2001	2008	APA	
Japan	Ningyo Johruri Bunraku Puppet Theatre	2003	2008	APA	
Japan	Kabuki Theatre	2005	2008	APA	
Japan	Akiu no Taue Odori		2009	APA	
Japan	Chakkirako		2009	APA	
Japan	Daimokutate		2009	APA	
Japan	Dainichido Bugaku		2009	APA	
Japan	Gagaku		2009	APA	
Japan	Hayachine Kagura		2009	APA	
Japan	Ojiya-chijimi, Echigo-jofu: techniques of making ramie fabric in Uonuma region, Niigata Prefecture		2009	APA	
Japan	Oku-noto no Aenokoto		2009	APA	
Japan	Traditional Ainu dance		2009	APA	
Japan	Kumiodori, traditional Okinawan musical theatre		2010	APA	
Japan	Yuki tsumugi, silk fabric production technique		2010	APA	
Japan	Mibu no Hana Taue, ritual of transplanting rice in Mibu, Hiroshima		2011	APA	
Japan	Sada Shin Noh, sacred dancing at Sada shrine, Shimane		2011	APA	
Japan	Nachi no Dengaku, a religious performing art held at the Nachi fire festival		2012	APA	
Japan	Washoku, traditional dietary cultures of the Japanese, notably for the celebration of New Year		2013	APA	
Japan	Washi, craftsmanship of traditional Japanese hand-made paper		2014	APA	
Japan	Washi, craftsmanship of traditional Japanese hand-made paper		2025	APA	
Japan	Raiho-shin, ritual visits of deities in masks and costumes		2018	APA	
Japan	Furyu-odori, ritual dances imbued with people's hopes and prayers		2022	APA	
Japan	Traditional knowledge and skills of sake-making with koji mold in Japan		2024	APA	
Japan	Traditional skills, techniques and knowledge for the conservation and transmission of wooden architecture in Japan		2025	APA	
Japan	Yama, Hoko, Yatai, float festivals		2025	APA	
Jordan	The Cultural Space of the Bedu in Petra and Wadi Rum	2005	2008	AST	
Jordan	As-Samer in Jordan		2018	AST	
Jordan	Al-Mansaf in Jordan, a festive banquet and its social and cultural meanings		2022	AST	
Jordan	Al-Mihrass tree: knowledge, skills and rituals associated with it		2025	AST	
Kazakhstan	Kazakh traditional art of Dombra Kuy		2014	APA	
Kazakhstan	Kazakh traditional Assyk games		2017	APA	
Kazakhstan	Traditional spring festive rites of the Kazakh horse breeders		2018	APA	
Kazakhstan	Orteke, traditional performing art in Kazakhstan: dance, puppet and music		2022	APA	
Kazakhstan	Betashar, traditional wedding ritual		2024	APA	
Kazakhstan; Kyrgyzstan	Aitysh/Aitys, art of improvisation		2015	APA	
Kazakhstan; Kyrgyzstan; Turkey	Traditional intelligence and strategy game: Togyzqumalaq, Toguz Korgool, Mangala/Göçürme		2020	APA	
Kazakhstan; Kyrgyzstan; Uzbekistan	Traditional knowledge and skills in making Kyrgyz, Kazakh and Karakalpak yurts (Turkic nomadic dwellings)		2014	APA	
Kazakhstan; Kyrgyzstan; Uzbekistan	Traditional knowledge and skills in making Kyrgyz, Kazakh and Karakalpak yurts (Turkic nomadic dwellings)		2025	APA	
Kuwait	The Diwaniya, a unifying cultural practice in Kuwait		2025	AST	
Kuwait; Saudi Arabia; Qatar	Traditional weaving of Al Sadu		2025	AST	
Kyrgyzstan	The Art of Akyns, Kyrgyz Epic Tellers	2003	2008	APA	
Kyrgyzstan	Kyrgyz epic trilogy: Manas, Semetey, Seytek		2013	APA	
Kyrgyzstan	Kok boru, traditional horse game		2017	APA	
Kyrgyzstan	Ak-kalpak craftsmanship, traditional knowledge and skills in making and wearing Kyrgyz men's headwear		2019	APA	
Kyrgyzstan	Elechek, Kyrgyz female headwear: traditional knowledge and rituals		2023	APA	
Kyrgyzstan	Traditional knowledge and cultural contexts of making Maksym, a traditional Kyrgyz beverage		2025	APA	
Laos	Khaen music of the Lao people		2017	APA	
Laos	Traditional craft of Naga motif weaving in Lao communities		2023	APA	
Laos	Fonelamvonglao (lamvonglao)		2024	APA	
Lebanon	Zajal, recited or sung poetry	2003	2014	APA	
Lebanon	Al-Man’ouché, an emblematic culinary practice in Lebanon	2022	2023	APA	
Lithuania	Cross crafting and its symbolism	2001	2008	ENA	
Lithuania	Sutartinės, Lithuanian multipart songs		2010	ENA	
Lithuania	Sodai straw garden making in Lithuania		2023	ENA	
Luxembourg	Hopping procession of Echternach		2010	ENA	
Madagascar	The Woodcrafting Knowledge of the Zafimaniry	2003	2008	AFR	
Madagascar	Malagasy Kabary, the Malagasy oratorical art		2021	AFR	
Madagascar	Hiragasy, a performing art of the Central Highlands of Madagascar		2023	AFR	
Madagascar	Tsapiky, rhythm and musical style characteristic of the South-West region of Madagascar		2025	AFR	
Malawi	The Vimbuza Healing Dance	2005	2008	AFR	
Malawi	Tchopa, sacrificial dance of the Lhomwe people of southern Malawi		2014	AFR	
Malawi	Nsima, culinary tradition of Malawi		2017	AFR	
Malawi	Mwinoghe, joyous dance		2018	AFR	
Malawi; Mozambique; Zambia	The Gule Wamkulu	2005	2008	AFR	
Malawi; Zimbabwe	Art of crafting and playing Mbira/Sansi, the finger-plucking traditional musical instrument in Malawi and Zimbabwe		2020	AFR	
Malaysia	Mak Yong Theatre	2005	2008	APA	
Malaysia	Dondang Sayang		2018	APA	
Malaysia	Silat		2019	APA	
Malaysia	Songket		2021	APA	
Malaysia	Breakfast culture in Malaysia: dining experience in a multi-ethnic society		2024	APA	
Mali	The Cultural Space of the Yaaral and Degal	2003	2008	AFR	
Mali	The Manden Charter, proclaimed in Kurukan Fuga		2009	AFR	
Mali	The septennial re-roofing ceremony of the Kamablon, sacred house of Kangaba		2009	AFR	
Mali	Coming forth of the masks and puppets in Markala		2014	AFR	
Mali; Burkina Faso; Côte d'Ivoire; Indonesia	Cultural practices and expressions linked to Balafon and Kolintang in Mali, Burkina Faso, Côte d'Ivoire and Indonesia		2024	AFR, APA	
Malta	Il-Ftira, culinary art and culture of flattened sourdough bread in Malta		2020	ENA	
Malta	L-Għana, a Maltese folksong tradition		2021	ENA	
Malta	Maltese Village Festa, an annual community celebration		2023	ENA	
Mauritania	Mahadra, a community system for transmission of traditional knowledge and oral expressions		2023	AFR	
Mauritania	The Epic of Samba Gueladio		2024	AFR	
Mauritius	Traditional Mauritian Sega		2014	AFR	
Mauritius	Bhojpuri folk songs in Mauritius, Geet-Gawai		2016	AFR	
Mauritius	Sega tambour of Rodrigues Island		2017	AFR	
Mexico	The Indigenous Festivity dedicated to the Dead	2003	2008	LAC	
Mexico	Places of memory and living traditions of the Otomí-Chichimecas people of Tolimán: the Peña de Bernal, guardian of a sacred territory		2009	LAC	
Mexico	Ritual ceremony of the Voladores: Papantla, El Tajín		2009	LAC	
Mexico	Traditional Mexican cuisine – ancestral, ongoing community culture, the Michoacán paradigm		2010	LAC	
Mexico	Parachicos in the traditional January feast of Chiapa de Corzo		2010	LAC	
Mexico	Pirekua, traditional song of the Purépecha		2010	LAC	
Mexico	Mariachi, string music, song and trumpet		2011	LAC	
Mexico	Charrería, equestrian tradition in Mexico		2016	LAC	
Mexico	La Romería: ritual cycle of 'La llevada' of the Virgin of Zapopan		2018	LAC	
Mexico	Representation of the Passion, Death and Resurrection of Christ in Iztapalapa		2025	LAC	
Mexico; Spain	Artisanal talavera of Puebla and Tlaxcala (Mexico) and ceramics of Talavera de la Reina and El Puente del Arzobispo (Spain) making process		2019	LAC; ENA	
Moldova; Romania	The Christmas carols in masculine horde		2013	ENA	
Moldova; Romania	Traditional wall-carpet craftsmanship in Romania and the Republic of Moldova		2016	ENA	
Moldova; Romania	The art of the traditional blouse with embroidery on the shoulder (altiţă) — an element of cultural identity in Romania and the Republic of Moldova		2022	ENA	
Moldova; Romania	Cobza, traditional knowledge, skills and music		2025	ENA	
Mongolia	The Traditional Music of the Morin Khuur	2003	2008	APA	
Mongolia	Mongolian art of singing: Khoomei		2010	APA	
Mongolia	The Traditional Naadam festival		2010	APA	
Mongolia	Traditional craftsmanship of the Mongol Ger and its associated customs		2013	APA	
Mongolia	Mongolian knuckle-bone shooting		2014	APA	
Mongolia	Traditional technique of making Airag in Khokhuur and its associated customs		2019	APA	
Mongolia	Mongol nomad migration and its associated practices		2024	APA	
Montenegro	Cultural Heritage of Boka Navy Kotor: a festive representation of a memory and cultural identity		2021	ENA	
Morocco	The Cultural Space of Jemaa el-Fna Square	2001	2008	AFR, AST	
Morocco	The Moussem of Tan-Tan	2005	2008	AFR, AST	
Morocco	Cherry festival in Sefrou		2012	AFR, AST	
Morocco	Argan, practices and know-how concerning the argan tree		2014	AFR, AST	
Morocco	Taskiwin, martial dance of the western High Atlas		2017	AFR, AST	
Morocco	Gnawa		2019	AFR, AST	
Morocco	Tbourida		2021	AFR, AST	
Morocco	Malhun, a popular poetic and musical art		2023	AFR, AST	
Morocco	Moroccan Caftan: art, traditions and skills		2025	AFR, AST	
Mozambique	The Chopi Timbila	2005	2008	AFR	
Myanmar	Myanmar traditional New Year Atā Thingyan festival	2023	2024	APA	
Namibia	Oshituthi shomagongo, marula fruit festival		2015	AFR	
Netherlands	Craft of the miller operating windmills and watermills		2017	ENA	
Netherlands	Corso culture, flower and fruit parades in the Netherlands		2021	ENA	
Netherlands	Rotterdam Summer Carnival		2023	ENA	
Nicaragua	El Güegüense	2005	2008	LAC	
Niger	Practices and expressions of joking relationships in Niger		2014	AFR	
Nigeria	The Ifá Divination System	2005	2008	AFR	
Nigeria	Ijele masquerade		2009	AFR	
Nigeria	The Argungu Fishing Festival		2016	AFR	
Nigeria	Kwagh-Hir theatrical performance		2019	AFR	
Nigeria	Sango Festival, Oyo		2023	AFR	
Nigeria	Durbar in Kano		2024	AFR	
North Korea	Arirang folk song in the Democratic People's Republic of Korea		2014	APA	
North Korea	Tradition of kimchi-making in the Democratic People's Republic of Korea		2015	APA	
North Korea	Pyongyang Raengmyon custom		2022	APA	
North Korea	Custom of Korean costume: traditional knowledge, skills and social practices in the Democratic People's Republic of Korea		2024	APA	
North Korea; South Korea	Traditional Korean wrestling (Ssirum/Ssireum)		2018	APA	
North Macedonia	Feast of the Holy Forty Martyrs in Štip		2013	ENA	
North Macedonia	Kopachkata, a social dance from the village of Dramche, Pijanec		2014	ENA	
North Macedonia; Turkey	Spring celebration, Hıdrellez		2017	ENA	
North Macedonia; Turkey	Traditional bagpipe (Gayda/Tulum) making and performing		2024	ENA	
Norway	Practice of traditional music and dance in Setesdal, playing, dancing and singing (stev/stevjing)		2019	ENA	
Norway	Traditional costumes in Norway, craftsmanship and social practice		2024	ENA	
Oman	Al-Bar’ah, music and dance of Oman Dhofari valleys		2010	AST	
Oman	Al 'azi, elegy, processional march and poetry		2012	AST	
Oman	Horse and camel Ardhah		2018	AST	
Oman	Al-Khanjar, craft skills and social practices		2022	AST	
Oman; Qatar; Saudi Arabia; United Arab Emirates	Majlis, a cultural and social space		2015	AST	
Oman; Saudi Arabia; United Arab Emirates	Alheda'a, oral traditions of calling camel flocks		2022	AST	
Oman; United Arab Emirates	Al-Ayyala, a traditional performing art of the Sultanate of Oman and the United Arab Emirates		2014	AST	
Oman; United Arab Emirates	Al-Taghrooda, traditional Bedouin chanted poetry		2012	AST	
Oman; United Arab Emirates	Al-Razfa, a traditional performing art		2015	AST	
Oman; United Arab Emirates	Camel racing, a social practice and a festive heritage associated with camels		2020	AST	
Palestine	The Palestinian hikaye	2005	2008	AST	
Palestine	The art of embroidery in Palestine, practices, skills, knowledge and rituals		2021	AST	
Palestine	Dabkeh, traditional dance in Palestine		2023	AST	
Palestine	Tradition of Nabulsi soap making in Palestine		2024	AST	
Panama	Artisanal processes and plant fibers techniques for talcos, crinejas and pintas weaving of the pintao hat		2017	LAC	
Panama	Ritual and festive expressions of the Congo culture		2018	LAC	
Panama	Dances and expressions associated with the Corpus Christi Festivity		2021	LAC	
Paraguay	Practices and traditional knowledge of Terere in the culture of Pohã Ñana, Guaraní ancestral drink in Paraguay		2020	LAC	
Paraguay	Guarania, sound of Paraguayan soul		2024	LAC	
Peru	Taquile and its Textile Art	2005	2008	LAC	
Peru	Huaconada, ritual dance of Mito		2010	LAC	
Peru	The scissors dance		2010	LAC	
Peru	Pilgrimage to the sanctuary of the Lord of Qoyllurit'i		2011	LAC	
Peru	Knowledge, skills and rituals related to the annual renewal of the Q'eswachaka bridge		2013	LAC	
Peru	Virgen de la Candelaria, Harákmbut sung prayers of Peru's Huachipaire people		2014	LAC	
Peru	Wititi dance of the Colca Valley		2015	LAC	
Peru	Traditional system of Corongo's water judges		2017	LAC	
Peru	'Hatajo de Negritos' and 'Hatajo de Pallitas' from the Peruvian south-central coastline		2019	LAC	
Peru	Pottery-related values, knowledge, lore and practices of the Awajún people		2021	LAC	
Peru	Practices and meanings associated with the preparation and consumption of ceviche, an expression of Peruvian traditional cuisine	2023	2023	LAC	
Peru	Sarawja, Aimara music and dance of Moquegua		2025	LAC	
Philippines	The Hudhud Chants of the Ifugao	2001	2008	APA	
Philippines	The Darangen Epic of the Maranao People of Lake Lanao	2005	2008	APA	
Philippines	Aklan piña handloom weaving		2023	APA	
Poland	Nativity scene tradition in Kraków		2018	ENA	
Poland	Flower carpets tradition for Corpus Christi processions		2021	ENA	
Poland	Polonaise, traditional Polish dance		2023	ENA	
Poland	Basketry traditions		2025	ENA	
Portugal	The Fado, urban popular song of Portugal, performance genre incorporating music and poetry widely practised in the country and among emigrant communities		2011	ENA	
Portugal	The Cante Alentejano, polyphonic singing from Alentejo, southern Portugal		2014	ENA	
Portugal	Craftmanship of Estremoz clay figures		2017	ENA	
Portugal	Winter festivities, Carnival of Podence		2019	ENA	
Portugal	Community festivities in Campo Maior		2021	ENA	
Portugal	Equestrian art in Portugal		2024	ENA	
Romania	The Căluș tradition	2005	2008	ENA	
Romania	Doina		2009	ENA	
Romania	The Horezu ceramics		2012	ENA	
Romania	Lad's dances		2015	ENA	
Russia	The Cultural Space and Oral Culture of the Semeiskie	2001	2008	ENA	
Russia	The Olonkho, Yakut Heroic Epos	2005	2008	ENA	
Rwanda	Intore		2024	AFR	
Samoa	'Ie Samoa, fine mat and its cultural value		2019	APA	
Sao Tome and Principe	Tchiloli, living theatre of Sao Tome and Principe in the quest of justice		2025	APA	
Saudi Arabia	Alardah Alnajdiyah, dance, drumming and poetry in Saudi Arabia		2015	AST	
Saudi Arabia	Almezmar, drumming and dancing with sticks		2016	AST	
Saudi Arabia	Al-Qatt Al-Asiri, female traditional interior wall decoration in Asir, Saudi Arabia		2017	AST	
Saudi Arabia	Knowledge and practices related to cultivating Khawlani coffee beans		2022	AST	
Saudi Arabia	Cultural practices related to Taif roses		2024	AST	
Saudi Arabia; Algeria; Bahrain; Egypt; Iraq; Jordan; Kuwait; Lebanon; Mauritania; Morocco; Oman; Palestine; Sudan; Tunisia; United Arab Emirates; Yemen	Arabic calligraphy: knowledge, skills and practices		2021	AST	
Senegal	Xooy, a divination ceremony among the Serer of Senegal		2013	AFR	
Senegal	Ceebu Jën, a culinary art of Senegal		2021	AFR	
Serbia	Slava, celebration of family saint patron's day		2014	ENA	
Serbia	Kolo, traditional folk dance		2017	ENA	
Serbia	Singing to the accompaniment of the gusle		2018	ENA	
Serbia	Zlakusa pottery		2020	ENA	
Serbia	Social practices and knowledge related to the preparation and use of the traditional plum spirit – šljivovica		2022	ENA	
Serbia	Naïve painting practices of Kovačica		2024	ENA	
Seychelles	Moutya		2021	AFR	
Singapore	Hawker culture		2020	APA	
Slovakia	Fujara and its music	2005	2008	ENA	
Slovakia	Music of Terchová		2013	ENA	
Slovakia	Bagpipe culture		2015	ENA	
Slovakia	Multipart singing of Horehronie		2017	ENA	
Slovakia	Drotárstvo, wire craft and art		2019	ENA	
Slovenia	Škofja Loka passion play		2016	ENA	
Slovenia	Door-to-door rounds of Kurenti		2017	ENA	
Slovenia	Bobbin lacemaking in Slovenia		2018	ENA	
Slovenia	Beekeeping in Slovenia, a way of life		2022	ENA	
South Korea	Royal Ancestral Ritual in the Jongmyo Shrine and its Music	2001	2008	APA	
South Korea	Pansori singing	2003	2008	APA	
South Korea	Gangneung Danoje	2005	2008	APA	
South Korea	Cheoyongmu		2009	APA	
South Korea	Ganggangsullae		2009	APA	
South Korea	Jeju Chilmeoridang Yeongdeunggut		2009	APA	
South Korea	Namsadang Nori		2009	APA	
South Korea	Yeongsanjae		2009	APA	
South Korea	Daemokjang, traditional wooden architecture		2010	APA	
South Korea	Gagok, lyric song cycles accompanied by an orchestra		2010	APA	
South Korea	Jultagi, tightrope walking		2011	APA	
South Korea	Taekkyeon, a traditional Korean martial art		2011	APA	
South Korea	Weaving of Mosi (fine ramie) in the Hansan region		2011	APA	
South Korea	Arirang, lyrical folk song in the Republic of Korea		2012	APA	
South Korea	Kimjang, making and sharing Kimchi in the Republic of Korea		2013	APA	
South Korea	Nongak, community band music, dance and rituals in the Republic of Korea		2014	APA	
South Korea	Culture of Jeju Haenyeo (women divers)		2016	APA	
South Korea	Yeondeunghoe, lantern lighting festival in the Republic of Korea		2020	APA	
South Korea	Talchum, mask dance drama in the Republic of Korea		2022	APA	
South Korea	Knowledge, beliefs and practices related to jang making in the Republic of Korea		2024	APA	
Spain	The Mystery Play of Elche	2001	2008	ENA	
Spain	The Patum of Berga	2005	2008	ENA	
Spain	Irrigators' tribunals of the Spanish Mediterranean coast: the Council of Wise Men of the plain of Murcia and the Water Tribunal of the plain of Valencia		2009	ENA	
Spain	Whistled language of the island of La Gomera		2009	ENA	
Spain	Human towers		2010	ENA	
Spain	Flamenco		2010	ENA	
Spain	Chant of the Sybil on Majorca		2010	ENA	
Spain	Festivity of 'la Mare de Déu de la Salut' of Algemesí		2011	ENA	
Spain	Fiesta of the patios in Cordoba		2012	ENA	
Spain	Valencia Fallas festivity		2016	ENA	
Spain	Tamboradas drum-playing rituals		2018	ENA	
Spain	Wine Horses		2020	ENA	
Spain	Manual bell ringing		2022	ENA	
Spain	Asturian cider culture		2024	ENA	
Spain; Italy	Manual bell ringing		2024	ENA	
Sri Lanka	Rūkada Nātya, traditional string puppet drama in Sri Lanka		2018	APA	
Sri Lanka	Traditional craftsmanship of making Dumbara Ratā Kalāla		2021	APA	
Sri Lanka	Kithul Madeema/Kithul Kapeema, an ancient indigenous technology for tapping Kithul in Sri Lanka		2025	APA	
Sudan	Procession and celebrations of Prophet Mohammed's birthday in Sudan		2023	AFR	
Sudan	Al-Jertiq: practices, rituals and expressions for preservation, protection, abundance and fertility in Sudan		2025	AFR	
Sweden; Norway	Summer farming at fäbod and seter: knowledge, traditions and practices related to the grazing of outlying lands and artisan food production		2024	ENA	
Switzerland	Winegrowers' Festival in Vevey (Fête des Vignerons)		2016	ENA	
Switzerland	Basel Carnival		2017	ENA	
Switzerland	Holy Week processions in Mendrisio		2019	ENA	
Switzerland	Alpine pasture season		2023	ENA	
Switzerland	Yodelling		2025	ENA	
Syria	Practices and craftsmanship associated with the Damascene rose in Al-Mrah		2019	AST	
Syria	Al-Qudoud al-Halabiya		2021	AST	
Syria	Craftsmanship of Aleppo Ghar soap		2024	AST	
Tajikistan	Oshi Palav, a traditional meal and its social and cultural contexts		2016	APA	
Tajikistan	Chakan, embroidery art		2018	APA	
Tajikistan	Falak		2021	APA	
Tajikistan	Traditional knowledge and skills of production of the atlas and adras fabrics		2023	APA	
Tajikistan	Culture of Sumanak/Sumalak cooking		2025	APA	
Tajikistan; Uzbekistan	Shashmaqom Music	2003	2008	APA	
Thailand	Khon, masked dance drama in Thailand		2018	APA	
Thailand	Nuad Thai, traditional Thai massage		2019	APA	
Thailand	Nora, dance drama in southern Thailand		2021	APA	
Thailand	Songkran in Thailand, traditional Thai New Year festival		2023	APA	
Thailand	Tomyum Kung		2024	APA	
Togo	The bearing of the sacred stone or the rites of the New Year in the Guin country in Togo		2025	AFR	
Tonga	The Lakalaka, Dances and Sung Speeches of Tonga	2003	2008	APA	
Tunisia	Pottery skills of the women of Sejnane		2018	AST	
Tunisia	Charfia fishing in the Kerkennah Islands		2020	AST	
Tunisia	Harissa, knowledge, skills and culinary and social practices		2022	AST	
Tunisia	Performing arts among the Twāyef of Ghbonten		2024	AST	
Turkey	The Arts of the Meddah, Public Storytellers	2003	2008	ENA	
Turkey	The Mevlevi Sema Ceremony	2005	2008	ENA	
Turkey	Karagöz and Hacivat		2009	ENA	
Turkey	Âşıklık tradition		2009	ENA	
Turkey	Traditional Sohbet meetings		2010	ENA	
Turkey	Kırkpınar oil wrestling festival		2010	ENA	
Turkey	Semah, Alevi-Bektaşi ritual		2010	ENA	
Turkey	Ceremonial Keşkek tradition		2011	ENA	
Turkey	Mesir Macunu festival		2012	ENA	
Turkey	Turkish coffee culture and tradition		2013	ENA	
Turkey	Ebru, Turkish art of marbling		2014	ENA	
Turkey	Traditional craftsmanship of Çini-making		2016	ENA	
Turkey	Traditional Turkish archery		2019	ENA	
Turkey	Hüsn-i Hat, traditional calligraphy in Islamic art in Turkey		2021	ENA	
Turkey	Antep İşi, drawn thread embroidery of Gaziantep		2025	ENA	
Turkmenistan	Epic art of Gorogly		2015	APA	
Turkmenistan	Kushtdepdi rite of singing and dancing		2017	APA	
Turkmenistan	Traditional Turkmen carpet making art in Turkmenistan		2019	APA	
Turkmenistan	Dutar making craftsmanship and traditional music performing art combined with singing		2021	APA	
Turkmenistan	Art of Akhal-Teke horse breeding and traditions of horses' decoration		2023	APA	
Turkmenistan	The art of breeding Turkmen alabay		2025	APA	
Turkmenistan; Iran	Turkmen-style needlework art		2022	APA	
Uganda	Barkcloth making in Uganda	2005	2008	AFR	
Ukraine	Petrykivka decorative painting as a phenomenon of the Ukrainian ornamental folk art		2013	ENA	
Ukraine	Tradition of Kosiv painted ceramics		2019	ENA	
Ukraine	Ornek, a Crimean Tatar ornament and knowledge about it		2021	ENA	
Ukraine; Estonia	Pysanka, Ukrainian tradition and art of decorating eggs		2024	ENA	
United Arab Emirates	Al Aflaj, traditional irrigation network system in the UAE, oral traditions, knowledge and skills of construction, maintenance and equitable water distribution		2020	AST	
United Arab Emirates	Al Talli, traditional embroidery skills in the United Arab Emirates		2022	AST	
United Arab Emirates	Al Ahalla, a living performing art in the United Arab Emirates		2025	AST	
United Arab Emirates	Al Sadu, traditional weaving skills in the United Arab Emirates		2025	AST	
United Arab Emirates; Algeria; Bahrain; Egypt; Iraq; Jordan; Kuwait; Mauritania; Morocco; Oman; Palestine; Qatar; Saudi Arabia; Sudan; Tunisia; Yemen	Henna: rituals, aesthetic and social practices		2024	AST	
United Arab Emirates; Oman; Qatar; Saudi Arabia; Jordan	Arabic coffee, a symbol of generosity		2024	AST	
United Arab Emirates; Oman; Saudi Arabia	Harees dish: know-how, skills and practices		2023	AST	
Uruguay	The Candombe and its socio-cultural space: a community practice		2009	LAC	
Uzbekistan	The Cultural Space of the Boysun District	2001	2008	APA	
Uzbekistan	Katta Ashula		2009	APA	
Uzbekistan	Askiya, the art of wit		2014	APA	
Uzbekistan	Palov culture and tradition		2016	APA	
Uzbekistan	Khorazm dance, Lazgi		2019	APA	
Uzbekistan	Bakhshi art		2021	APA	
Uzbekistan	Ceramic arts in Uzbekistan		2023	APA	
Vanuatu	Vanuatu Sand Drawings	2003	2008	APA	
Venezuela	Dancing Devils of Corpus Christi		2012	LAC	
Venezuela	The Parranda de San Pedro of Guarenas and Guatire		2013	LAC	
Venezuela	Traditional knowledge and technologies relating to the growing and processing of the curagua		2015	LAC	
Venezuela	Carnival of El Callao, a festive representation of a memory and cultural identity		2016	LAC	
Venezuela	Festive cycle around the devotion and worship towards Saint John the Baptist		2021	LAC	
Venezuela	Joropo in Venezuela		2025	LAC	
Vietnam	Space of gong culture	2005	2008	APA	
Vietnam	Nhã nhạc, Vietnamese court music	2003	2008	APA	
Vietnam	Quan Họ Bắc Ninh folk songs		2009	APA	
Vietnam	Gióng Festival of Phù Đổng and Sóc Temples		2010	APA	
Vietnam	Worship of Hùng Kings in Phú Thọ		2012	APA	
Vietnam	Art of Đờn ca tài tử music and song in southern Việt Nam		2013	APA	
Vietnam	Ví and Giặm folk songs of Nghệ Tĩnh		2014	APA	
Vietnam	Practices related to the Viet beliefs in the Mother Goddesses of Three Realms		2016	APA	
Vietnam	Xoan singing of Phú Thọ province, Viet Nam		2017	APA	
Vietnam	The art of Bài chòi in Central Viet Nam		2017	APA	
Vietnam	Practices of Then by Tày, Nùng and Thái ethnic groups in Viet Nam		2019	APA	
Vietnam	Art of Xòe dance of the Tai people in Viet Nam		2021	APA	
Vietnam	Festival of Bà Chúa Xứ Goddess at Sam Mountain		2024	APA	
Yemen	Song of Sana'a	2003	2008	AST	
Yemen	Hadrami Dan gathering		2025	AST	
Zambia	The Makishi Masquerade	2005	2008	AFR	
Zambia	Mooba dance of the Lenje ethnic group		2018	AFR	
Zambia	Budima dance		2020	AFR	
Zambia	Kalela dance		2022	AFR	
Zambia	Mangwengwe dance		2024	AFR	
Zimbabwe	The Mbende Jerusarema Dance	2005	2008	AFR	

== List of Intangible Cultural Heritage in Need of Urgent Safeguarding ==
The List of Intangible Cultural Heritage in Need of Urgent Safeguarding contains intangible cultural heritage elements "that concerned communities and States Parties consider require urgent measures to keep them alive".

Member state	Element^{[A]}	Year inscribed^{[C]}	Region^{[D]}	Ref.
Albania	Xhubleta, skills, craftsmanship and forms of usage	2022	ENA	
Albania	Art of playing, singing and making the Lahuta	2025	ENA	
Algeria	Knowledge and skills of the water measurers of the foggaras or water bailiffs of Touat and Tidikelt	2018	AST	
Azerbaijan	Chovqan, a traditional Karabakh horse-riding game	2013	ENA	
Azerbaijan	Yalli (Kochari, Tenzere), traditional group dances of Nakhchivan	2018	ENA	
Belarus	Rite of the Kalyady Tsars (Christmas Tsars)	2009	ENA	
Belarus	Spring rite of Juraŭski Karahod	2019	ENA	
Botswana	Earthenware pottery-making skills in Botswana's Kgatleng District	2012	AFR	
Botswana	Dikopelo folk music of Bakgatla ba Kgafela in Kgatleng District	2017	AFR	
Botswana	Seperu folkdance and associated practices	2019	AFR	
Brazil	Yaokwa, the Enawene Nawe people's ritual for the maintenance of social and cosmic order	2011	LAC	
Cambodia	The stringed music instrument Chapei dang veng	2016	APA	
Cambodia	The dance drama Lkhon Khol Wat Svay Andet	2018	APA	
Chile	Quinchamalí and Santa Cruz de Cuca pottery	2022	LAC	
China	Traditional design and practices for building Chinese wooden arch bridges	2009	APA	
China	Traditional Li textile techniques: spinning, dyeing, weaving and embroidering	2009	APA	
China	Qiang New Year Festival	2009	APA	
China	Meshrep	2010	APA	
China	Watertight-bulkhead technology of Chinese junks	2010	APA	
China	Wooden movable-type printing of China	2010	APA	
China	Hezhen Yimakan storytelling	2011	APA	
Colombia	Traditional Vallenato music of the Greater Magdalena region	2015	LAC	
Colombia	Traditional knowledge and techniques associated with Pasto Varnish mopa-mopa of Putumayo and Nariño	2020	LAC	
Colombia; Venezuela	Colombian-Venezuelan llano work songs	2017	LAC	
Croatia	Ojkanje singing	2010	ENA	
Egypt	Traditional Hand Puppetry—Al-Aragoz	2018	AST	
Egypt	Handmade weaving in Upper Egypt (Sa'eed)	2020	AST	
Estonia	Building and use of expanded dugout boats in the Soomaa region	2021	ENA	
France	Cantu in paghjella, a secular and liturgical oral tradition of Corsica	2009	ENA	
Federated States of Micronesia	Carolinian wayfinding and canoe making	2021	APA	
Guatemala	Nan Pa'ch ceremony	2013	LAC	
Indonesia	Saman dance	2011	APA	
Indonesia	Noken multifunctional knotted or woven bag, handcraft of the people of Papua	2012	APA	
Indonesia	Reog Ponorogo performing art	2024	APA	
Iran	Naqqāli, Iranian dramatic story-telling	2011	APA	
Iran	Traditional skills of building and sailing Iranian Lenj boats in the Persian Gulf	2011	APA	
Kenya	Traditions and practices associated with the Kayas in the sacred forests of the Mijikenda	2009	AFR	
Kenya	Isukuti dance of Isukha and Idakho communities of Western Kenya	2014	AFR	
Kenya	Rituals and practices associated with Kit Mikayi shrine	2019	AFR	
Kenya	Enkipaata, Eunoto and Olng'esherr, three male rites of passage of the Maasai community	2018	AFR	
Kuwait	Al Sadu traditional weaving skills in Kuwait	2020	AST	
Kyrgyzstan	Ala-kiyiz and Shyrdak, art of Kyrgyz traditional felt carpets	2012	APA	
Latvia	Suiti cultural space	2009	ENA	
Malaysia	Mek Mulung	2023	APA	
Mali	Sanké mon, collective fishing rite of the Sanké	2009	AFR	
Mali	Secret society of the Kôrêdugaw, the rite of wisdom in Mali	2011	AFR	
Mali	Cultural practices and expressions linked to the 'M'Bolon', a traditional musical percussion instrument	2021	AST	
Mauritania	Moorish epic T'heydinn	2011	AST	
Mauritius	Sega Tambour Chagos	2019	AFR	
Mongolia	Mongol Biyelgee, Mongolian traditional folk dance	2009	APA	
Mongolia	Tsuur end-blown flute	2009	APA	
Mongolia	Mongol Tuuli, Mongolian epic	2009	APA	
Mongolia	Folk long song performance technique of Limbe performances - circular breathing	2011	APA	
Mongolia	Mongolian calligraphy	2013	APA	
Mongolia	Coaxing ritual for camels	2015	APA	
Mongolia	Mongolian traditional practices of worshipping the sacred sites	2017	APA	
Namibia	Aixan/Gana/Ob#ANS TSI //Khasigu, ancestral musical sound knowledge and skills	2020	AFR	
North Macedonia	Glasoechko, male two-part singing in Dolni Polog	2015	ENA	
Pakistan	Suri Jagek (observing the sun)	2018	APA	
Philippines	Buklog, thanksgiving ritual system of the Subanen	2019	APA	
Peru	Eshuva, Harákmbut sung prayers of Peru's Huachipaire people	2011	LAC	
Portugal	Manufacture of cowbells	2015	ENA	
Portugal	Bisalhães black pottery manufacturing process	2016	ENA	
Syria	Shadow play	2018	AST	
Timor-Leste	Tais, traditional textile	2021	APA	
Turkey	Whistled language, Turkish bird language	2017	ENA	
Turkey	Traditional Ahlat stonework	2022	ENA	
Uganda	Bigwala, gourd trumpet music and dance of the Busoga Kingdom in Uganda	2012	AFR	
Uganda	Empaako of the Batooro, Banyoro, Batuku, Batagwenda and Banyabindi of western Uganda	2013	AFR	
Uganda	Male-child cleansing ceremony of the Lango of central northern Uganda	2014	AFR	
Uganda	Koogere oral tradition of the Basongora, Banyabindi and Batooro peoples	2015	AFR	
Uganda	Ma'di bowl lyre music and dance	2016	AFR	
Ukraine	Cossack's songs of Dnipropetrovsk Region	2016	ENA	
Ukraine	Culture of Ukrainian borscht cooking	2022	ENA	
United Arab Emirates	Al Sadu traditional weaving skills in the United Arab Emirates	2011	AST	
United Arab Emirates	Al Azi, art of performing praise, pride and fortitude poetry	2017	AST	
Venezuela	Mapoyo oral tradition and its symbolic reference points within their ancestral territory	2014	LAC	
Vietnam	Ca trù singing	2009	APA	
Vietnam	Art of pottery-making of Chăm people	2022	APA	

== Register of Good Safeguarding Practices ==
The Register for Good Safeguarding Practices allows States Parties, communities and other stakeholders to "share successful safeguarding experiences and examples of how they surmounted challenges faced in the transmission of their living heritage, its practice and knowledge to the future generation."

Member state	Projects and Activities^{[A]}	Year Inscribed^{[C]}	Region^{[D]}	Ref.
Austria	Regional Centres for Craftsmanship: a strategy for safeguarding the cultural heritage of traditional handicraft (see "Werkraum Bregenzerwald" (Vorarlberg), "Textiles Zentrum Haslach" (Upper Austria), "Hand.Werk.Haus Salzkammergut" (Upper Austria))	2016	ENA	
Austria; France; Germany; Norway; Switzerland	Craft techniques and customary practices of cathedral workshops, or Bauhütten, in Europe, know-how, transmission, development of knowledge and innovation	2020	ENA	
Belgium	Programme of cultivating ludodiversity: safeguarding traditional games in Flanders	2011	ENA	
Belgium	Safeguarding the carillon culture: preservation, transmission, exchange and awareness-raising	2014	ENA	
Belgium	Safeguarding foster care heritage in the merciful city of Geel: a community-based care model	2023	ENA	
Belgium; Croatia; Cyprus; France; Italy	Tocatì, a shared programme for the safeguarding of traditional games and sports	2022	ENA	
Bolivia; Chile; Peru	Safeguarding intangible cultural heritage of Aymara communities in Bolivia, Chile and Peru	2009	LAC	
Brazil	Call for projects of the National Programme of Intangible Heritage	2011	LAC	
Brazil	Fandango's Living Museum	2011	LAC	
Bulgaria	Festival of folklore in Koprivshtitsa: a system of practices for heritage presentation and transmission	2016	ENA	
Bulgaria	Bulgarian Chitalishte (Community Cultural Centre): practical experience in safeguarding the vitality of the Intangible Cultural Heritage	2017	ENA	
China	Strategy for training coming generations of Fujian puppetry practitioners	2012	APA	
Colombia	Safeguarding strategy of traditional crafts for peace building	2019	LAC	
Croatia	Community project of safeguarding the living culture of Rovinj/Rovigno: the Batana Ecomuseum	2016	ENA	
Czech Republic	Strategy for safeguarding traditional crafts: The Bearers of Folk Craft Tradition programme	2022	ENA	
France	The Martinique yole, from construction to sailing practices, a model for heritage safeguarding	2020	ENA	
Greece	Polyphonic Caravan, researching, safeguarding and promoting the Epirus polyphonic song	2020	ENA	
Hungary	Táncház method: a Hungarian model for the transmission of intangible cultural heritage	2011	ENA	
Hungary	Safeguarding of the folk music heritage by the Kodály concept	2016	ENA	
Indonesia	Education and training in Indonesian Batik intangible cultural heritage for elementary, junior, senior, vocational school and polytechnic students, in collaboration with the Batik Museum in Pekalongan	2009	APA	
Iran	National programme to safeguard the traditional art of calligraphy in Iran	2021	APA	
Kenya	Success story of promoting traditional foods and safeguarding traditional foodways in Kenya	2021	AFR	
Kuwait	Al Sadu Educational Programme: Train the trainers in the art of weaving	2022	ENA	
Kyrgyzstan	Nomad games, rediscovering heritage, celebrating diversity	2021	APA	
Mexico	Xtaxkgakget Makgkaxtlawana: the Centre for Indigenous Arts and its contribution to safeguarding the intangible cultural heritage of the Totonac people of Veracruz, Mexico	2012	LAC	
Norway	Oselvar boat - reframing a traditional learning process of building and use to a modern context	2016	ENA	
Oman	Oman Youth Sail Training Ship (Safinat Shabab Oman) programme for peace and sustainable cultural dialogue	2024	ENA	
Panama	ICH safeguarding practices program for the cultural and ecologic Sea Turtle Festival of Armila	2023	LAC	
Philippines	The School of Living Traditions (SLT)	2021	APA	
Portugal; Spain	Portuguese-Galician border ICH: a safeguarding model created by Ponte...nas ondas!	2022	ENA	
Slovakia	School of Crafts ÚĽUV	2024	ENA	
Spain	Centre for traditional culture – school museum of Pusol pedagogic project	2009	ENA	
Spain	Revitalization of the traditional craftsmanship of lime-making in Morón de la Frontera, Seville, Andalusia	2011	ENA	
Spain	Methodology for inventorying intangible cultural heritage in biosphere reserves: the experience of Montseny	2013	ENA	
Sweden	Land-of-Legends programme, for promoting and revitalizing the art of storytelling in Kronoberg Region (South-Sweden)	2018	ENA	
Sweden	Nyckelharpa network, an innovative dissemination of a music and instrument-building tradition with roots in Sweden	2023	ENA	
Ukraine	Safeguarding programme of kobza and wheel lyre tradition	2024	ENA	
Uzbekistan	Margilan Crafts Development Centre, safeguarding of the atlas and adras making traditional technologies	2017	APA	
Venezuela	Biocultural programme for the safeguarding of the tradition of the Blessed Palm in Venezuela	2019	LAC	
Venezuela	Program for the safeguarding of the Bandos and Parrandas of the Holy Innocents of Caucagua: nuclei of initiation and transmission of wisdoms and community councils	2023	LAC	

== Proclaimed masterpieces ==
The Lists of Intangible Cultural Heritage were established in 2008, when the Convention for the Safeguarding of Intangible Cultural Heritage took effect. Prior to this, a project known as the Masterpieces of the Oral and Intangible Heritage of Humanity has already been active in recognizing the value of intangibles such as tradition, custom, and cultural spaces and the local actors who sustain these forms of cultural expressions through a Proclamation. Identification of the Masterpieces also entails the commitment of states to promote and safeguard these treasures, while UNESCO finances plans for their conservation. Started in 2001 and held biennially until 2005, a total of three Proclamations occurred, encompassing 90 forms of intangible heritage around the world.

The 90 previously proclaimed Masterpieces have been incorporated into the Representative List of the Intangible Cultural Heritage of Humanity as its first entries, to be known as elements. Subsequent elements will be added following the assessment of nominations submitted by national governments acceding to the UNESCO Convention, termed as member states, who are each allowed to submit a single candidature file, in addition to multi-national candidatures. A panel of experts in intangible heritage and an appointed body, known as the Intergovernmental Committee for the Safeguarding of Intangible Cultural Heritage, then examine each of the nominations before officially inscribing the candidates as elements on the List.

== See also ==
- Intangible cultural heritage
- UNESCO Collection of Representative Works
- UNESCO Global Geoparks
- World Heritage Site
- World Network of Biosphere Reserves
- Memory of the World Programme

== Notes ==
A. Names and spellings used for the elements were based on the official List as published.
B. A total of three Proclamations of Masterpieces of the Oral and Intangible Heritage of Humanity were made in 2001, 2003, and 2005. The proclamation was superseded in 2008 when the Representative List of the Intangible Cultural Heritage of Humanity was established.
C. The 90 elements that were previously proclaimed as Masterpieces have been inscribed onto the Representative List of the Intangible Cultural Heritage of Humanity as per the Convention for the Safeguarding of Intangible Cultural Heritage.
D. Grouping of member states by region is based on the official List as published. Abbreviations were used for convenience:

- AFR: Africa
- AST: Arab States
- APA: Asia and the Pacific
- ENA: Europe and North America
- LAC: Latin America and the Caribbean

E. The Transcaucasian States of Armenia, Azerbaijan and Georgia, and Russian Federation are included in the Europe and North America Region.
