= Ekpessosso =

New year ritual of the Guin people of Togo

The taking of the sacred stone or the New Year rites of the Guin people in Togo
- UNESCO Intangible Cultural Heritage
- Departure of Akléma for Glidji during the Epé-Ekpé ceremonies in Aného
- Country: Togo
- Reference: 02241
- Region: Africa

Inscription history
- Inscription: 2025 (20th session)
- List: Representative

Ekpessosso (also spelled Ekpesoso, and known as Epé-Ekpé or the taking of the sacred stone) is an annual ritual of the Guin (or Guen) people of south-eastern Togo.

It is a central part of the Epé-Ekpé ceremonial cycle, the traditional Guin new year, celebrated mainly in Glidji every September in the Lacs region. In December 2025, the ritual was inscribed on UNESCO's Representative List of the Intangible Cultural Heritage of Humanity.

== The ritual and its origins ==
Ceremony of the taking of the sacred stone among the Guin

The Epé-Ekpé new year cycle is held mainly in Glidji each September. Ekpessosso marks the yearly unveiling of a sacred stone, interpreted as a message from the deities. The ceremony takes place in the sacred forest of Gbatsomé and is led by the high priests of the main Guin deities. The colour and nature of the stone are traditionally read as signs guiding the community for the coming year. It is part of a wider sequence of rites that includes purification, the invocation of ancestors, a ritual meal of unity and a closing carnival.

According to oral tradition, the Guin migrated from the Accra area (in present-day Ghana) around the 17th century and settled around Aného and Glidji, where they founded a kingdom under King Foli Bébé. The Epé-Ekpé cycle draws partly on older practices of the Ga people.

== UNESCO inscription and significance ==
Ritual dance among the Guin people

On 11 December 2025, at the 20th session of the Intergovernmental Committee for the Safeguarding of the Intangible Cultural Heritage in New Delhi, Ekpessosso was inscribed on the Representative List. The nomination was led by the Académie du Guingbé et des savoirs endogènes guin et mina. It is Togo's third element recognised by UNESCO, after the Gẹlẹdẹ oral heritage and midwifery.

Beyond its religious role, the ritual expresses the bond between the living, the ancestors and the deities. It is a marker of Guin identity, associated with solidarity and social cohesion, and supports cultural tourism in the Aného area.

== See also ==
- Gen-Mina people
- Gẹlẹdẹ
- West African Vodún
- Lists of Intangible Cultural Heritage elements
