= Pit courtyard =

Form of traditional building in China

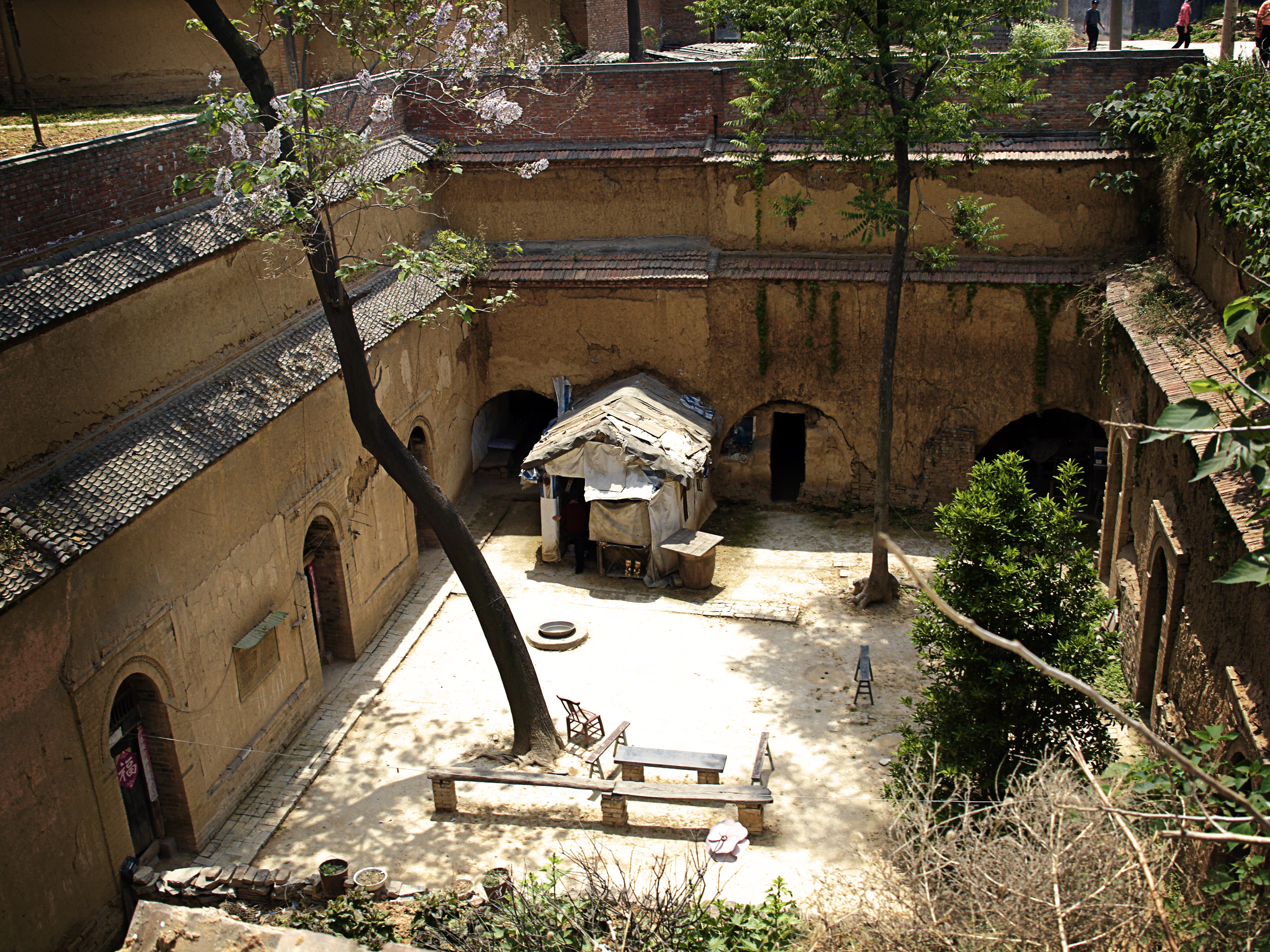
A Pit Courtyard

A pit courtyard or Dikengyuan (Chinese: 地坑院; pinyin: De kēng yuàn) is a traditional form of subterranean residential architecture found primarily in the Shaanxi, Henan, and Gansu Provinces.

== Description ==
Dikengyuan has gradually become a symbol of nostalgia after the Cultural Revolution in China. Some localities have made use of them to develop tourism, and in 2011, the "Dikengyuan construction technique" was listed on the UNESCO Intangible Cultural Heritage Lists.

== Pit courtyards and tourism ==
Developing tourism based on Dikengyuan houses has become an important way for some local communities economically.

On April 21, 2020, Sanmenxia Daily newspaper published an article titled "Highlighting Regional Characteristics and Creating Dikengyuan Folk Tourism"
