= List of Intangible Cultural Heritage elements in Brunei =

The United Nations Educational, Scientific and Cultural Organisation (UNESCO) identifies intangible cultural heritage as the "non-physical traditions and practices that are performed by a people". As part of a country's cultural heritage, they include celebrations, festivals, performances, oral traditions, music, and the making of handicrafts. The "intangible cultural heritage" is defined by the Convention for the Safeguarding of Intangible Cultural Heritage, drafted in 2003 and took effect in 2006. Inscription of new heritage elements on the UNESCO Intangible Cultural Heritage Lists is determined by the Intergovernmental Committee for the Safeguarding of Intangible Cultural Heritage, an organisation established by the convention.

Brunei Darussalam ratified the convention on 12 August 2011.

== Intangible Cultural Heritage of Humanity ==
+ Transnational element

=== Representative List ===
| Name | Image | Year | No. | Description |
|---|---|---|---|---|
| Kebaya: knowledge, skills, traditions and practices + (Note: Shared with Indonesia, Malaysia, Singapore, and Thailand.) | | 2024 | 02090 | A kebaya is an upper garment opened at the front and made from lightweight fabrics traditionally worn by women in Southeast Asia. |
| Pantun + (Note: Shared with Indonesia and Malaysia.) | | 2025 | 02274 | Pantun is a Malayic oral poetic form used to express intricate ideas and emotions. |
