= List of Intangible Cultural Heritage elements in Yemen =

The United Nations Educational, Scientific and Cultural Organisation (UNESCO) intangible cultural heritage elements are the non-physical traditions and practices performed by a people. As part of a country's cultural heritage, they include celebrations, festivals, performances, oral traditions, music, and the making of handicrafts. The "intangible cultural heritage" is defined by the Convention for the Safeguarding of Intangible Cultural Heritage, drafted in 2003 and took effect in 2006. Inscription of new heritage elements on the UNESCO Intangible Cultural Heritage Lists is determined by the Intergovernmental Committee for the Safeguarding of Intangible Cultural Heritage, an organisation established by the convention.

Yemen ratified the convention on 8 October 2007.

== Intangible Cultural Heritage of Humanity ==
+ Transnational element

=== Representative List ===
Name	Media	Year inscribed	No.	Description
Song of Sana’a		2008	00077	This form of performance uses sung poetry and is called homayni; it is a tradition that dates to the 14th century. The urban homayni style known in the capital of Yemen, Sanaani singing, is the most well-known today.
Arabic calligraphy: knowledge, skills and practices + (Note: Shared with Algeria, Bahrain, Egypt, Iraq, Jordan, Kuwait, Lebanon, Mauritania, Morocco, Oman, Palestine, Saudi Arabia, Sudan, Tunisia, and United Arab Emirates.)		2021	01718	The artistic practice of writing Arabic letters and words to convey grace and beauty.
Date palm, knowledge, skills, traditions and practices + (Note: Shared with Bahrain, Egypt, Iraq, Jordan, Kuwait, Mauritania, Morocco, Oman, Palestine, Qatar, Saudi Arabia, Sudan, Tunisia, and United Arab Emirates.)		2022	01902	There is a long history of cultivation and utilisation of the date palm in the region, which has led to the development of traditional crafts and social practises.
Arts, skills and practices associated with engraving on metals (gold, silver and copper) + (Note: Shared with Algeria, Egypt, Iraq, Mauritania, Morocco, Palestine, Saudi Arabia, Sudan, and Tunisia.)		2023	01951	
Henna, rituals, aesthetic and social practices + (Note: Shared with Algeria, Saudi Arabia, Bahrain, Egypt, United Arab Emirates, Iraq, Jordan, Kuwait, Morocco, Mauritania, Oman, Qatar, Sudan, Tunisia, and Palestine.)		2024	02116	A temporary tattooing practice with medicinal and aesthetic motivations.
Hadrami Dan gathering		2025	02232	

== See also ==
- List of World Heritage Sites in Yemen
