= Nan Pa'ch ceremony =

- Genre: Thanks for good harvests ritual
- Frequency: Annual
- Location(s): San Pedro Sacatepéquez, Guatemala

Nan Pa'ch ceremony
- UNESCO Intangible Cultural Heritage
- Country: Guatemala
- Reference: 00863
- Region: Latin America and the Caribbean

Inscription history
- Inscription: 2013 (8th session)
- List: Need of Urgent Safeguarding

The Nan Pa'ch ceremony (also Paach ceremony) is a corn-veneration ritual celebrated in San Pedro Sacatepéquez, San Marcos in Guatemala. On December 7, 2013 UNESCO officially recognized the ceremony as Intangible Cultural Heritage in Need of Urgent Safeguarding.

The ceremony gives thanks for good harvests in a ritual that highlights the close connection between humans and nature. The ritual features prayers in the Mam language as well as the dressed ceremonial corncobs.

The Paach ceremony has become increasingly infrequent, with some young people seeing it as irrelevant and old fashioned, while economic insecurity has caused some bearers to withdraw from the practice due to a loss of faith.
