= List of Intangible Cultural Heritage elements in Tunisia =

The United Nations Educational, Scientific and Cultural Organisation (UNESCO) intangible cultural heritage elements are the non-physical traditions and practices performed by a people. As part of a country's cultural heritage, they include celebrations, festivals, performances, oral traditions, music, and the making of handicrafts. The "intangible cultural heritage" is defined by the Convention for the Safeguarding of Intangible Cultural Heritage, drafted in 2003 and took effect in 2006. Inscription of new heritage elements on the UNESCO Intangible Cultural Heritage Lists for their protection and safeguard is determined by the Intergovernmental Committee for the Safeguarding of Intangible Cultural Heritage, an organisation established by the convention.

Brazil ratified the convention on 24 July 2006.

== Intangible Cultural Heritage of Humanity ==
+ Transnational element

=== Representative List ===
Name	Image	Year	No.	Description
Pottery skills of the women of Sejnane		2019	01406	Pottery skills of the women of Sejnane
Date palm, knowledge, skills, traditions and practices + (Note: Shared with Bahrain, Egypt, Iraq, Jordan, Kuwait, Mauritania, Morocco, Oman, Palestine, Qatar, Saudi Arabia, Sudan, the United Arab Emirates, and Yemen.)		2019	01902	Date palm and practices around it have strong cultural and historical significance in the Middle East and North Africa.
Knowledge, know-how and practices pertaining to the production and consumption of couscous + (Note: Shared with Algeria, Mauritania, and Morocco.)		2020	01602	Couscous is a Berber dish that is beloved across northern Africa's Maghreb region and beyond.
Charfia fishing in the Kerkennah Islands		2020	01566	Charfia fishing in the Kerkennah Islands
Arabic calligraphy: knowledge, skills and practices + (Note: Shared with Algeria, Bahrain, Egypt, Iraq, Jordan, Kuwait, Lebanon, Mauritania, Morocco, Oman, Palestine, Saudi Arabia, Sudan, the United Arab Emirates, and Yemen.)		2021	01718	Arabic calligraphy is a form of artistic expression that involves writing Arabic script in a fluid and graceful manner.
Harissa, knowledge, skills and culinary and social practices		2022	01710	Harissa is a hot chili pepper paste, native to Tunisia.
Arts, skills and practices associated with engraving on metals (gold, silver and copper) + (Note: Shared with Algeria, Egypt, Iraq, Mauritania, Morocco, Palestine, Saudi Arabia, Sudan, and Yemen.)		2023	01951	Engraving on metals such as gold, silver and copper is a centuries-old practice that entails manually cutting words, symbols or patterns into the surfaces of decorative, utilitarian, religious or ceremonial objects.
Henna, rituals, aesthetic and social practices + (Note: Shared with Algeria, Saudi Arabia, Bahrain, Egypt, Iraq, Jordan, Kuwait, Palestine, Mauritania, Morocco, Oman, Qatar, Sudan, the United Arab Emirates, and Yemen.)		2024	02116	A temporary tattooing practice with medicinal and aesthetic motivations.
Performing arts among the Twāyef of Ghbonten		2024	01875	Twāyef are troupes of poet singers affiliated with the Ghbonten tribe.
Arabic Kohl + (Note: Shared with Iraq, Jordan, Libya, Oman, Palestine, Saudi Arabia, Syria, and the United Arab Emirates.)		2025	02261	Kohl is a fine black powder used as eyeliner traditionally made by crushing stibnite.

== See also ==
- List of World Heritage Sites in Tunisia
