= Vallja e Tropojës =

Albanian folk dance

- Genre: Folk dance Circle dance
- Origin: Tropojë, Albania

K'cimi dancing of Tropojë
- UNESCO Intangible Cultural Heritage
- Country: Albania
- Reference: 01881
- Region: Europe and North America

Inscription history
- Inscription: 2024 (19th session)
- List: Representative

Vallja e Tropojës is a traditional Albanian folk dance originating from the region of Tropojë in northern Albania. Known for its dynamic and rhythmic movements, the dance is an important cultural expression that reflects the history, social values, and traditions of the region. Traditionally performed by groups in a circle or line, it is accompanied by traditional Albanian instruments. As a testament to its importance, the Vallja e Tropojës under the name of K'cimi dancing of Tropojë has been inscribed on the UNESCO Intangible Cultural Heritage List in December 2024.

== See also ==
- List of Albanian dances
- List of Intangible Cultural Heritage elements in Albania
- List of World Heritage Sites in Albania
