= List of Intangible Cultural Heritage elements in Slovenia =

The United Nations Educational, Scientific and Cultural Organisation (UNESCO) identifies intangible cultural heritage as the "non-physical traditions and practices that are performed by a people". As part of a country's cultural heritage, they include celebrations, festivals, performances, oral traditions, music, and the making of handicrafts. The "intangible cultural heritage" is defined by the Convention for the Safeguarding of Intangible Cultural Heritage, drafted in 2003 and took effect in 2006. Inscription of new heritage elements on the UNESCO Intangible Cultural Heritage Lists is determined by the Intergovernmental Committee for the Safeguarding of Intangible Cultural Heritage, an organisation established by the convention.

Slovenia ratified the convention on 18 September 2008.

== Intangible Cultural Heritage of Humanity ==
+ Transnational element

=== List ===
Name	Image	Year	No.	Description
Škofja Loka Passion Play		2016	01203	It is a penitential Passion procession in Škofja Loka.
Door-to-door rounds of Kurenti		2017	01278	Kurentovanje is Slovenia's most popular and ethnologically significant carnival event. This 11-day rite of spring and fertility highlight event is celebrated on Shrove Sunday in Ptuj.
Bobbin lacemaking in Slovenia		2018	01378	
Beekeeping in Slovenia, a way of life		2022	01857	
Lipizzan horse breeding traditions + (Note: Shared with Austria, Bosnia and Herzegovina, Croatia, Hungary, Italy, Romania, and Slovakia.)		2022	01687	
Midwifery: knowledge, skills and practices + (Note: Shared with Colombia, Cyprus, Kyrgyzstan, Luxembourg, Nigeria, Germany, and Togo.)		2023	01968	A midwife is a health professional who cares for mothers and newborns.
Art of dry stone construction, knowledge and techniques + (Note: Shared with Croatia, Cyprus, France, Greece, Italy, Spain, Switzerland, Andorra, Austria, Belgium, Ireland, and Luxembourg.)		2024	02106	

== See also ==
- List of World Heritage Sites in Slovenia
