= List of Intangible Cultural Heritage elements in Egypt =

The United Nations Educational, Scientific and Cultural Organisation (UNESCO) identifies intangible cultural heritage as the "non-physical traditions and practices that are performed by a people". As part of a country's cultural heritage, they include celebrations, festivals, performances, oral traditions, music, and the making of handicrafts. The "intangible cultural heritage" is defined by the Convention for the Safeguarding of Intangible Cultural Heritage, drafted in 2003 and took effect in 2006. Inscription of new heritage elements on the UNESCO Intangible Cultural Heritage Lists is determined by the Intergovernmental Committee for the Safeguarding of Intangible Cultural Heritage, an organisation established by the convention.

Egypt ratified the convention on 3 August 2005.

== Intangible Cultural Heritage of Humanity ==
+ Transnational element

=== Representative List ===
Name	Image	Year	No.	Description
Al-Sirah Al-Hilaliyyah epic		2008	00075	Al-Sirah Al-Hilaliyyah is an epic oral poem that recounts the tale of the journey of the Bedouin tribe of the Banu Hilal from Najd in Arabia to Tunisia and Algeria via Egypt.
Tahteeb, stick game		2016	01189	Tahteeb is a traditional stick-fighting martial art.
Arabic calligraphy: knowledge, skills and practices + (Note: Shared with Algeria, Bahrain, Iraq, Jordan, Kuwait, Lebanon, Mauritania, Morocco, Oman, Palestine, Saudi Arabia, Sudan, Tunisia, United Arab Emirates, and Yemen.)		2021	01718	The artistic practice of writing Arabic letters and words to convey grace and beauty.
Festivals related to the Journey of the Holy family in Egypt		2022	01700	
Date palm, knowledge, skills, traditions and practices + (Note: Shared with Bahrain, Iraq, Jordan, Kuwait, Mauritania, Morocco, Oman, Palestine, Qatar, Saudi Arabia, Sudan, Tunisia, United Arab Emirates, and Yemen.)		2022	01902	The Palm tree is considered to be a part of the history of the countries where it is a source for farmers, craftsmen, handicrafts owners, merchants, factory owners and food companies.
Arts, skills and practices associated with engraving on metals (gold, silver and copper) + (Note: Shared with Algeria, Iraq, Mauritania, Morocco, Palestine, Saudi Arabia, Sudan, Tunisia, and Yemen.)		2023	01951	
Henna, rituals, aesthetic and social practices + (Note: Shared with Algeria, Palestine, Bahrain, United Arab Emirates, Iraq, Jordan, Kuwait, Morocco, Mauritania, Oman, Qatar, Saudi Arabia, Sudan, Tunisia, and Yemen.)		2024	02116	A temporary tattooing practice with medicinal and aesthetic motivations.
Semsemiah: instrument crafting and playing + (Note: Shared with Saudi Arabia.)		2024	02119	Semsemiah or simsimiyya is a box or bowl lyre played in the Suez Canal region.
Koshary, daily life dish and practices associated with it		2025	02278	Koshary is a traditional Egyptian staple, mixing pasta, Egyptian fried rice, vermicelli and brown lentils, and topped with chickpeas, a garlicky tomato sauce, garlic vinegar, and crispy fried onions.

=== Elements in Need of Urgent Safeguarding ===
Name	Year	No.	Description
Traditional hand puppetry	2018	01376	Al-Aragoz is an old Egyptian theatre using traditional hand puppetry.
Handmade weaving in Upper Egypt (Sa'eed)	2020	01605	

== See also ==
- List of World Heritage Sites in Egypt
