= List of Intangible Cultural Heritage elements in Luxembourg =

The United Nations Educational, Scientific and Cultural Organisation (UNESCO) intangible cultural heritage elements are the non-physical traditions and practices performed by a people. As part of a country's cultural heritage, they include celebrations, festivals, performances, oral traditions, music, and the making of handicrafts. The "intangible cultural heritage" is defined by the Convention for the Safeguarding of Intangible Cultural Heritage, drafted in 2003 and took effect in 2006. Inscription of new heritage elements on the UNESCO Intangible Cultural Heritage Lists is determined by the Intergovernmental Committee for the Safeguarding of Intangible Cultural Heritage, an organisation established by the convention.

Luxembourg ratified the convention on 31 January 2006.

== Intangible Cultural Heritage of Humanity ==
+ Transnational element

=== Representative List ===
Name	Image	Year	No.	Description
Hopping procession of Echternach		2010	00392	This dancing procession is an annual Roman Catholic dancing procession held at Echternach. The procession is held every Whit Tuesday to honours Willibrord, the patron saint of Luxembourg, who established the Abbey of Echternach.
Musical art of horn players, an instrumental technique linked to singing, breath control, vibrato, resonance of place and conviviality + (Note: Shared with Belgium, France, and Italy.)		2020	01581	
Transhumance, the seasonal droving of livestock + (Note: Shared with Albania, Andorra, Austria, Croatia, France, Greece, Italy, Romania, and Spain.)		2023	01964	Transhumance is a type of pastoralism or nomadism, a seasonal movement of livestock between fixed summer and winter pastures.
Midwifery: knowledge, skills and practices + (Note: Shared with Colombia, France, Germany, Kyrgyzstan, Nigeria, Slovenia, and Togo.)		2023	01968	A midwife is a health professional who cares for mothers and newborns.
Traditional irrigation: knowledge, technique, and organization + (Note: Shared with Austria, Belgium, Germany, Italy, Netherlands, and Switzerland.)		2023	01979	Traditional irrigation uses gravity and hand-made constructions such as channels and ditches to distribute water from naturally occurring water catchment points (such as springs, streams and glaciers) to the fields.
Art of dry stone construction, knowledge and techniques + (Note: Shared with Croatia, Cyprus, France, Greece, Italy, Slovenia, Spain, Switzerland, Andorra, Austria, Belgium, and Ireland.)		2024	02106	Dry stone is a building method by which structures are constructed from stones without any mortar to bind them together.

== See also ==
- List of World Heritage Sites in Luxembourg
