= List of Intangible Cultural Heritage elements in Syria =

The United Nations Educational, Scientific and Cultural Organisation (UNESCO) intangible cultural heritage elements are the non-physical traditions and practices performed by a people. As part of a country's cultural heritage, they include celebrations, festivals, performances, oral traditions, music, and the making of handicrafts. The "intangible cultural heritage" is defined by the Convention for the Safeguarding of Intangible Cultural Heritage, drafted in 2003 and took effect in 2006. Inscription of new heritage elements on the UNESCO Intangible Cultural Heritage Lists is determined by the Intergovernmental Committee for the Safeguarding of Intangible Cultural Heritage, an organisation established by the convention.

Syria signed the convention on 11 March 2005.

== Intangible Cultural Heritage of Humanity ==
+ Transnational element

=== Representative List ===
Name	Image	Year	No.	Description
Practices and craftsmanship associated with the Damascene rose in Al-Mrah		2019	01369	Practices and craftsmanship associated with the Damascene rose by farmers and families in Al-Mrah.
Al-Qudoud al-Halabiya	A group of Syrian musicians from Aleppo.	2021	01578	Al-Qudoud al-Halabiya are traditional Syrian songs combining lyrics in Classical Arabic based on the poetry of Al-Andalus, particularly that in muwashshah form, with old religious melodies collected mainly by Aleppine musicians.
Falconry, a living human heritage + (Note: Shared with Austria, Belgium, Croatia, Czechia, France, Germany, Hungary, Ireland, Italy, Kazakhstan, Kyrgyzstan, Mongolia, Morocco, Netherlands, Pakistan, Poland, Portugal, Qatar, Slovakia, Saudi Arabia, South Korea, Spain, and the United Arab Emirates.)	A Saudi, dressed as a Syrian Bedouin, holds a hunting hawk.	2021	01708	The origin of falconry goes back to the use of hunting by birds of prey as a mean of hunting but it has evolved over time to become part of the cultural heritage of the people.
Crafting and playing the Oud + (Note: Shared with Iran.)	Syrian musicians in Aleppo with an oud, circa 1915.	2022	01867	The oud is a short-neck lute-type, pear-shaped, fretless stringed instrument.
Craftsmanship of Aleppo Ghar soap	Aleppo soap.	2024	02132	Ghar soap is a handmade, hard bar soap associated with the city of Aleppo.
Bisht (men's Abaa): skills and practices + (Note: Shared with Bahrain, Iraq, Jordan, Kuwait, Oman, Qatar, Saudi Arabia, and the United Arab Emirates.)		2025	02233	A bisht is a traditional men's cloak popular in the Arab world for hundreds of years.
Arabic Kohl + (Note: Shared with Iraq, Jordan, Libya, Oman, Palestine, Saudi Arabia, Tunisia, and the United Arab Emirates.)		2025	02261	Kohl is a fine black powder used as eyeliner traditionally made by crushing stibnite.

=== Elements in Need of Urgent Safeguarding ===
Name	Image	Year	No.	Description
Shadow play		2018	01368	Traditional handmade puppets shadows plays in Damascus.
Traditional Syrian glassblowing	Glassblowing in Damascus.	2023	01956	Traditional glassblowing is the artisanal craft of creating glass objects using pieces of waste glass, which are placed inside a handmade brick oven to melt. The craftsman twists the molten glass around a hollow metal rod, and then blows into the rod to inflate the glass, using metal tongs to mould it into the desired shape.

== See also ==
- List of World Heritage Sites in Syria
