= Kalyady Tsars =

Belarusian ritual and festivity

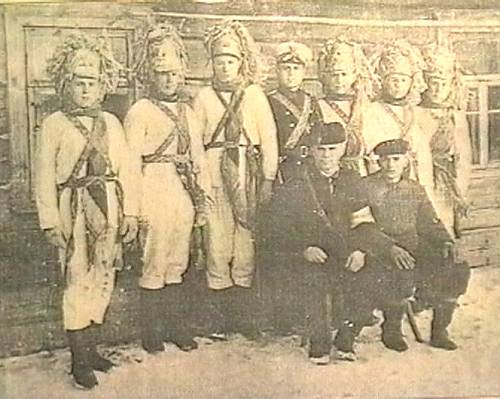
- Participants of Kalyady Tsars rite, before 1960
- Genre: Festival
- Frequency: Annual
- Locations: Semezhava, Belarus

Rite of the Kalyady Tsars (Christmas Tsars)
- UNESCO Intangible Cultural Heritage
- Country: Belarus
- Reference: 00308
- Region: Europe and North America

Inscription history
- Inscription: 2009 (4th session)
- List: Need of Urgent Safeguarding

Kalyady Tsars (Belarusian: Цары Каляды, 'Christmas Tsars') is a ritual and festive event celebrated in Semezhava village, Minsk Region, Belarus. In 2009, it was inscribed on the UNESCO List of Intangible Cultural Heritage in Need of Urgent Safeguarding.

== See also ==
- Tsar Maximilian
