= List of Intangible Cultural Heritage elements in Switzerland =

The United Nations Educational, Scientific and Cultural Organisation (UNESCO) intangible cultural heritage elements are the non-physical traditions and practices performed by a people. As part of a country's cultural heritage, they include celebrations, festivals, performances, oral traditions, music, and the making of handicrafts. The "intangible cultural heritage" is defined by the Convention for the Safeguarding of Intangible Cultural Heritage, drafted in 2003 and took effect in 2006. Inscription of new heritage elements on the UNESCO Intangible Cultural Heritage Lists is determined by the Intergovernmental Committee for the Safeguarding of Intangible Cultural Heritage, an organisation established by the convention.

Switzerland ratified the convention on 16 July 2008.

== Intangible Cultural Heritage of Humanity ==
+ Transnational element

=== Representative List ===
Name	Image	Year	No.	Description
Winegrowers' Festival in Vevey		2016	01201	The Fête des Vignerons (Winegrowers’ Festival) is a traditional festival which takes place in Vevey since 1797. The interval between two festivals has varied between 14 and 28 years.
Basel Carnival		2017	01262	The Carnival of Basel is the biggest carnival in the country and takes place annually in Basel.
Art of dry stone construction, knowledge and techniques + (Note: Shared with Croatia, Cyprus, France, Greece, Italy, Slovenia, Spain, Andorra, Austria, Belgium, Ireland, and Luxembourg.)		2018	02106	Dry stone is a building method by which structures are constructed from stones without any mortar to bind them together.
Avalanche risk management + (Note: Shared with Austria.)		2018	01380	
Holy Week processions in Mendrisio		2019	01460	The tradition of the Holy Week processions in Mendrisio.
Alpinism + (Note: Shared with France and Italy.)		2019	01471	
Craftsmanship of mechanical watchmaking and art mechanics + (Note: Shared with France.)		2020	01560	
Traditional irrigation: knowledge, technique, and organization + (Note: Shared with Austria, Belgium, Germany, Italy, Luxembourg, and Netherlands.)		2023	01979	
Alpine pasture season		2023	01966	
Yodeling		2025	02287	Yodeling is a form of singing which involves repeated and rapid changes of pitch between the low-pitch chest register (or "chest voice") and the high-pitch head register or falsetto.

=== Good Safeguarding Practices ===
Name	Year	No.	Description
Craft techniques and customary practices of cathedral workshops, or Bauhütten, in Europe, know-how, transmission, development of knowledge and innovation + (Note: Shared with Austria, France, Germany, and Norway.)	2020	01558	A Bauhütten (cathedral workshop), is a structure dedicated to the construction, maintenance and restoration of a monument with a specific mode of operation, known as Bauhüttenwesen.

== See also ==
- List of World Heritage Sites in Switzerland
