= List of Intangible Cultural Heritage elements in the Netherlands =

The United Nations Educational, Scientific and Cultural Organisation (UNESCO) intangible cultural heritage elements are the non-physical traditions and practices performed by a people. As part of a country's cultural heritage, they include celebrations, festivals, performances, oral traditions, music, and the making of handicrafts.

== Background ==
The "intangible cultural heritage" is defined by the Convention for the Safeguarding of Intangible Cultural Heritage, drafted in 2003 and took effect in 2006. Inscription of new heritage elements on the UNESCO Intangible Cultural Heritage Lists is determined by the Intergovernmental Committee for the Safeguarding of Intangible Cultural Heritage, an organisation established by the convention.

The Netherlands ratified the convention on 15 May 2012.

== Intangible Cultural Heritage of Humanity ==
+ Transnational element

=== Representative List ===
Name	Image	Year	No.	Description
Craft of the miller operating windmills and watermills		2017	01265	
Corso culture, flower and fruit parades in the Netherlands		2021	01707	Bloemencorso –meaning "flower parade/pageant/procession"–. is a parade where the floats (praalwagens), cars and –in some cases– boats are magnificently decorated or covered in flowers.
Falconry, a living human heritage + (Note: Shared with Austria, Belgium, Croatia, Czechia, France, Germany, Hungary, Ireland, Italy, Kazakhstan, Republic of Korea, Kyrgyzstan, Mongolia, Morocco, Pakistan, Poland, Portugal, Qatar, Saudi Arabia, Slovakia, Spain, Syria, and the United Arab Emirates.)		2021	01708	
Rotterdam Summer Carnival		2023	01870	The Zomercarnaval –meaning "Summer Carnaval"– is an annual event in Rotterdam. It mimics the Carnaval of Latin America and the Dutch Caribbean (Aruba, Bonaire & Curaçao).
Traditional irrigation: knowledge, technique, and organization + (Note: Shared with Austria, Belgium, Germany, Italy, Luxembourg, and Switzerland.)		2023	01979	

== See also ==
- List of World Heritage Sites in the Netherlands
