= List of Intangible Cultural Heritage elements in Bahrain =

The United Nations Educational, Scientific and Cultural Organisation (UNESCO) intangible cultural heritage elements are the non-physical traditions and practices performed by a people. As part of a country's cultural heritage, they include celebrations, festivals, performances, oral traditions, music, and the making of handicrafts. The "intangible cultural heritage" is defined by the Convention for the Safeguarding of Intangible Cultural Heritage, drafted in 2003 and took effect in 2006. Inscription of new heritage elements on the UNESCO Intangible Cultural Heritage Lists is determined by the Intergovernmental Committee for the Safeguarding of Intangible Cultural Heritage, an organisation established by the convention.

Bahrain signed the convention on 7 March 2014.

== Intangible Cultural Heritage of Humanity ==
+ Transnational element

=== Representative List ===
Name	Image	Year	No.	Description
Arabic calligraphy: knowledge, skills and practices + (Note: Shared with Algeria, Egypt, Iraq, Jordan, Kuwait, Lebanon, Mauritania, Morocco, Oman, Palestine, Saudi Arabia, Sudan, Tunisia, the United Arab Emirates, and Yemen.)		2021	01718	The artistic practice of writing Arabic letters and words to convey grace and beauty.
Fjiri		2021	01747	Fjiri is the specific repertoire of vocal music sung by the pearl divers.
Date palm, knowledge, skills, traditions and practices + (Note: Shared with Egypt, Iraq, Jordan, Kuwait, Mauritania, Morocco, Oman, Palestine, Qatar, Saudi Arabia, Sudan, Tunisia, the United Arab Emirates, and Yemen.)		2022	01902	The Palm tree is considered to be a part of the history of the countries where it is a source for farmers, craftsmen, handicrafts owners, merchants, factory owners and food companies.
Henna, rituals, aesthetic and social practices + (Note: Shared with Algeria, Saudi Arabia, Palestine, Egypt, United Arab Emirates, Iraq, Jordan, Kuwait, Morocco, Mauritania, Oman, Qatar, Sudan, Tunisia, and Yemen.)		2024	02116	A temporary tattooing practice with medicinal and aesthetic motivations.
Bisht (men's Abaa): skills and practices + (Note: Shared with Iraq, Jordan, Kuwait, Oman, Qatar, Saudi Arabia, Syria, and the United Arab Emirates.)		2025	02233	A bisht is a traditional men's cloak popular in the Arab world for hundreds of years.

== See also ==
- List of World Heritage Sites in Bahrain
