= List of Intangible Cultural Heritage elements in Austria =

The United Nations Educational, Scientific and Cultural Organisation (UNESCO) intangible cultural heritage elements are the non-physical traditions and practices performed by a people. As part of a country's cultural heritage, they include celebrations, festivals, performances, oral traditions, music, and the making of handicrafts. The "intangible cultural heritage" is defined by the Convention for the Safeguarding of Intangible Cultural Heritage, drafted in 2003 and took effect in 2006. Inscription of new heritage elements on the UNESCO Intangible Cultural Heritage Lists is determined by the Intergovernmental Committee for the Safeguarding of Intangible Cultural Heritage, an organisation established by the convention.

Austria ratified the convention on 9 April 2009.

== Intangible Cultural Heritage of Humanity ==
+ Transnational element

=== Representative List ===
Name	Image	Year	No.	Description
Schemenlaufen, the carnival of Imst, Austria		2012	00726	The carnival of Imst (Tyrol).
Classical horsemanship and the High School of the Spanish Riding School Vienna		2015	01106	
Blaudruck/Modrotisk/Kékfestés/Modrotlač, resist block printing and indigo dyeing in Europe + (Note: Shared with Czechia, Germany, Hungary and Slovakia.)		2018	01365	
Avalanche risk management + (Note: Shared with Switzerland.)		2018	01380	
Falconry, a living human heritage + (Note: Shared with Belgium, Croatia, Czechia, France, Germany, Hungary, Ireland, Italy, Kazakhstan, Republic of Korea, Kyrgyzstan, Mongolia, Morocco, Netherlands, Pakistan, Poland, Portugal, Qatar, Saudi Arabia, Slovakia, Spain, Syria, and the United Arab Emirates.)		2021	01708	
Lipizzan horse breeding traditions + (Note: Shared with Bosnia and Herzegovina, Croatia, Hungary, Italy, Romania, Slovakia and Slovenia.)		2022	01687	
Timber rafting + (Note: Shared with Czechia, Germany, Latvia, Poland, and Spain.)		2022	01866	Timber rafting is a method of transporting felled tree trunks by tying them together to make rafts, which are then drifted or pulled downriver, or across a lake or other body of water.
Traditional irrigation: knowledge, technique, and organization + (Note: Shared with Belgium, Germany, Italy, Luxembourg, Netherlands, and Switzerland.)		2023	01979	
Transhumance, the seasonal droving of livestock + (Note: Shared with Albania, Andorra, Croatia, France, Greece, Italy, Luxembourg, Romania, and Spain.)		2023	01964	Transhumance is a type of pastoralism or nomadism, a seasonal movement of livestock between fixed summer and winter pastures.
Art of dry stone construction, knowledge and techniques + (Note: Shared with Croatia, Cyprus, France, Greece, Italy, Slovenia, Spain, Switzerland, Andorra, Belgium, Ireland, and Luxembourg.)		2024	02106	Dry stone is a building method by which structures are constructed from stones without any mortar to bind them together.

=== Good Safeguarding Practices ===
Name	Year	No.	Description
Regional Centres for Craftsmanship: a strategy for safeguarding the cultural heritage of traditional handicraft	2016	01169	
Craft techniques and customary practices of cathedral workshops, or Bauhütten, in Europe, know-how, transmission, development of knowledge and innovation + (Note: Shared with France, Germany, Norway, and Switzerland.)	2020	01558	A Bauhütten (cathedral workshop), is a structure dedicated to the construction, maintenance and restoration of a monument with a specific mode of operation, known as Bauhüttenwesen.

== See also ==
- List of World Heritage Sites in Austria
