= List of Intangible Cultural Heritage elements in Portugal =

The United Nations Educational, Scientific and Cultural Organisation (UNESCO) identifies intangible cultural heritage as the "non-physical traditions and practices that are performed by a people". As part of a country's cultural heritage, they include celebrations, festivals, performances, oral traditions, music, and the making of handicrafts. The "intangible cultural heritage" is defined by the Convention for the Safeguarding of Intangible Cultural Heritage, drafted in 2003 and took effect in 2006. Inscription of new heritage elements on the UNESCO Intangible Cultural Heritage Lists is determined by the Intergovernmental Committee for the Safeguarding of Intangible Cultural Heritage, an organisation established by the convention.

Portugal ratified the convention on 21 May 2008. It registered its first element on the representative list in 2011.

== Intangible Cultural Heritage of Humanity ==
+ Transnational element

=== Representative List ===
Name	Image	Year	No.	Description
Fado, urban popular song of Portugal		2011	00563	Fado is a music genre which can be traced to the 1820s in Lisbon, but probably has much earlier origins.
Mediterranean diet + (Note: Shared with Croatia, Cyprus, Greece, Italy, Morocco, and Spain.)		2013	00884	The Mediterranean diet is the traditional food and methods of preparation used by the people of the Mediterranean basin, as well as everything related to it.
Cante Alentejano, polyphonic singing from Alentejo, southern Portugal		2014	01007	Cante Alentejano is a music genre based on vocal music without instrumentation from the Alentejo region.
Craftmanship of Estremoz clay figures		2017	01279	The Craftsmanship of Clay Figures in Estremoz involves a production process lasting several days.
Winter festivities, Carnival of Podence		2019	01463	Carnival in Podence.
Community festivities in Campo Maior		2021	01604	A recurring festival Festas do Povo includes the ornamentation of the streets of Campo Maior with paper flowers and other decorations.
Falconry, a living human heritage + (Note: Shared with Austria, Belgium, Croatia, Czechia, France, Germany, Hungary, Ireland, Italy, Kazakhstan, Republic of Korea, Kyrgyzstan, Mongolia, Morocco, Netherlands, Pakistan, Poland, Qatar, Saudi Arabia, Slovakia, Spain, the Syrian Arab Republic, and the United Arab Emirates.)		2021	01708	
Equestrian art in Portugal		2024	02079	

=== Good Safeguarding Practices ===
Name	Year	No.	Description
Portuguese-Galician border ICH: a safeguarding model created by Ponte...nas ondas! + (Note: Shared with Spain.)	2022	01848	The Ponte...nas ondas! (PNO!) is a project to safeguard intangible cultural heritage on the Portuguese-Galician border that began in the municipalities of Salvaterra de Miño (Pontevedra, Spain) and Monção (Viana do Castelo, Portugal).

=== Elements in Need of Urgent Safeguarding ===
Name	Image	Year	No.	Description
Manufacture of cowbells		2015	01065	The Portuguese cowbell is an idiophone percussion instrument with a single internal clapper, usually hung on a leather strap around an animal's neck.
Bisalhães black pottery manufacturing process		2016	01199	Bisalhães (Vila Real) in Portugal is known as 'the land of pot and pan producers' or more specifically, where black pottery is made.
Moliceiro boat: naval carpentry art of the Aveiro region		2025	01199	The Moliceiro boat is a traditional wooden vessel originally designed for harvesting aquatic plants in the Aveiro region.

== See also ==
- List of World Heritage Sites in Portugal
