= List of Intangible Cultural Heritage elements in Andorra =

The United Nations Educational, Scientific and Cultural Organisation (UNESCO) intangible cultural heritage elements are the non-physical traditions and practices performed by a people. As part of a country's cultural heritage, they include celebrations, festivals, performances, oral traditions, music, and the making of handicrafts. The "intangible cultural heritage" is defined by the Convention for the Safeguarding of Intangible Cultural Heritage, drafted in 2003 and took effect in 2006. Inscription of new heritage elements on the UNESCO Intangible Cultural Heritage Lists is determined by the Intergovernmental Committee for the Safeguarding of Intangible Cultural Heritage, an organisation established by the convention.

Andorra ratified the convention on 8 November 2013.

== Intangible Cultural Heritage of Humanity ==
+ Transnational element

=== Representative List ===
Name	Image	Year	No.	Description
Summer solstice fire festivals in the Pyrenees + (Note: Shared with France and Spain.)		2015	01073	The summer solstice fire festivals take place in the Pyrenees every year on the night of the day when the sun is at its zenith.
Bear festivities in the Pyrenees + (Note: Shared with France.)		2022	01846	
Transhumance, the seasonal droving of livestock + (Note: Shared with Albania, Austria, Croatia, France, Greece, Italy, Luxembourg, Romania, and Spain.)		2023	01964	Transhumance is a type of pastoralism or nomadism, a seasonal movement of livestock between fixed summer and winter pastures.
Art of dry stone construction, knowledge and techniques + (Note: Shared with Croatia, Cyprus, France, Greece, Italy, Slovenia, Spain, Switzerland, Austria, Belgium, Ireland, and Luxembourg.)		2024	02106	Dry stone is a building method by which structures are constructed from stones without any mortar to bind them together.
