= Pifilca =

Local musical instrument of Patagonia

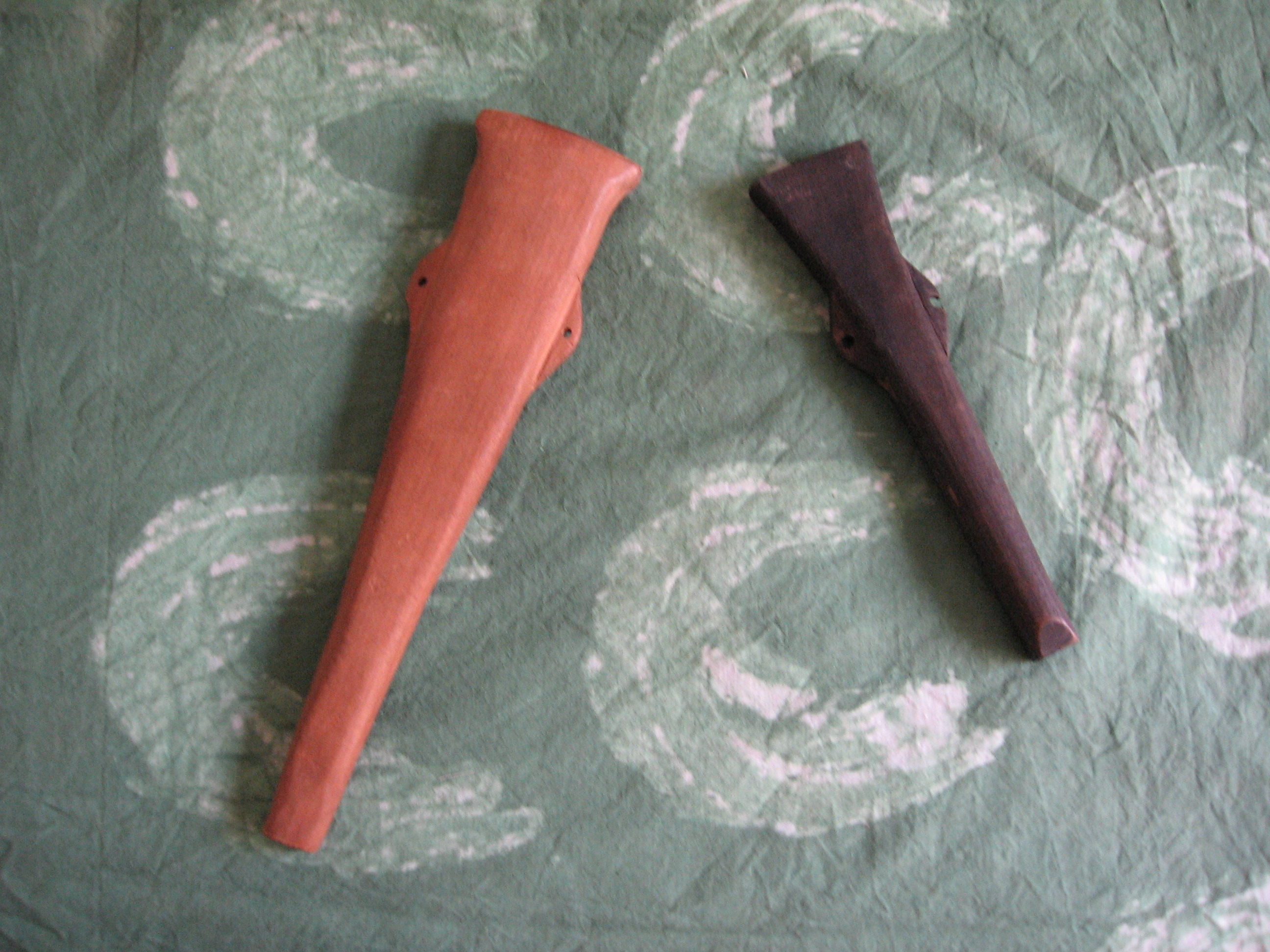
- Two pifilkas of different sizes

Woodwind instrument
- Hornbostel–Sachs classification: 421.111.22 (Straight flutes)
- Developed: Patagonia

Related instruments
- x; y

The Pifilca or Pivilca (Mapudungun language: onomatopoeia of its sound) is an aerophone of the flute family, a ductless flute, similar to a whistle. It is a typical instrument of the Mapuche people, and it is spread from central Chile to the Argentine provinces of Río Negro and Neuquén in Patagonia.

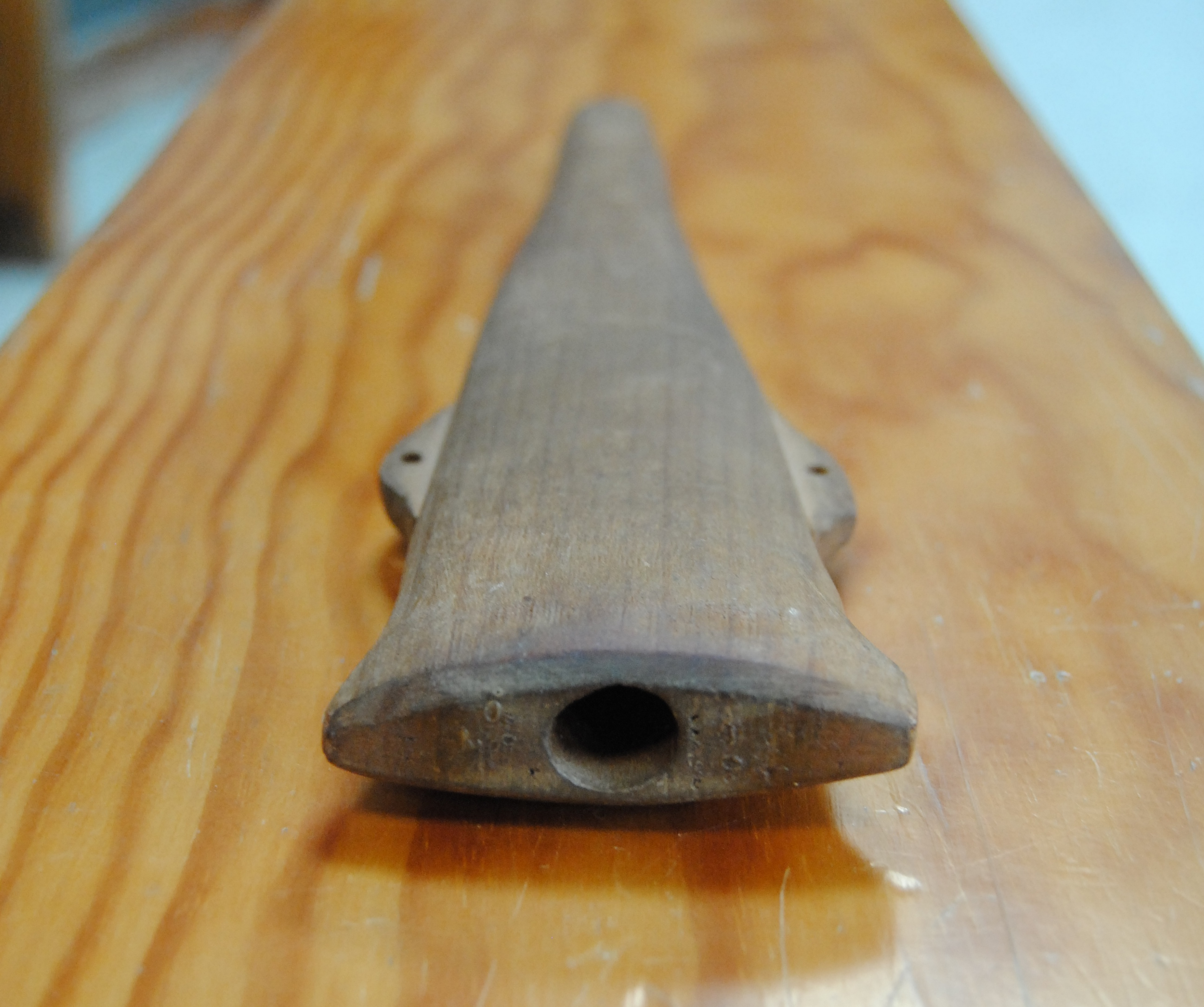

== Description ==
It is an aerophone made of wood or stone, between 30 and 40 centimetres (12–16 inches) long. It is similar to a flute, in that it has a tube running the length of the instrument. However, unlike the other flutes), it has a single opening, where the hole was drilled. The musician has no holes to open and close to change notes.

To play the instrument, the musician blows into the hole in the top center. The sound of the breath in the hole creates the instrument's single note, a rumble. Since the pifilca emits only one note it is used as an accompaniment or as a background for the rhythm.
