= List of World Heritage Sites in Qatar =

Location of World Heritage Sites in Qatar

The United Nations Educational, Scientific and Cultural Organization (UNESCO) World Heritage Sites are places of importance to cultural or natural heritage as described in the UNESCO World Heritage Convention, established in 1972. Cultural heritage consists of monuments (such as architectural works, monumental sculptures, or inscriptions), groups of buildings, and sites (including archaeological sites). Natural features (consisting of physical and biological formations), geological and physiographical formations (including habitats of threatened species of animals and plants), and natural sites which are important from the point of view of science, conservation or natural beauty, are defined as natural heritage. Qatar accepted the convention on September 12, 1984, making its historical sites eligible for inclusion on the list. As of 2023, Qatar has only one World Heritage Site, Al Zubara Fort, which was inscribed in 2013.

== World Heritage Sites ==
UNESCO lists sites under ten criteria; each entry must meet at least one of the criteria. Criteria i through vi are cultural, and vii through x are natural.

World Heritage Sites
Site	Image	Location (municipality)	Year listed	UNESCO data	Description
Al Zubarah Archaeological Site		Al Shamal Municipality	1402; iii, iv, v (cultural)	2013	The walled coastal town of Al Zubarah in the Persian Gulf flourished as a pearling and trading centre in the late 18th century and early 19th centuries, before it was destroyed in 1811 and abandoned in the early 1900s. Founded by merchants from Kuwait, Al Zubarah had trading links across the Indian Ocean, Arabia and Western Asia. A layer of sand blown from the desert has protected the remains of the site's palaces, mosques, streets, courtyard houses, and fishermen's huts; its harbour and double defensive walls, a canal, walls, and cemeteries. Excavation has only taken place over a small part of the site, which offers an outstanding testimony to an urban trading and pearl-diving tradition which sustained the region's major coastal towns and led to the development of small independent states that flourished outside the control of the Ottoman, European, and Persian empires and eventually led to the emergence of modern-day Gulf States.

== Tentative list ==
In addition to sites inscribed on the World Heritage List, member states can maintain a list of tentative sites that they may consider for nomination. Nominations for the World Heritage List are only accepted if the site was previously listed on the tentative list. As of 2025, Qatar has listed two properties on its tentative list.

Tentative sites
Site	Image	Location (municipality)	Year listed	UNESCO criteria	Description
Khor Al Adaid natural reserve		Al Wakrah Municipality	vii, viii (natural)	2008	A unique ecosystem known for its inland sea, a geographical phenomenon where the sea encroaches deep into the heart of the desert. This area, also referred to as the Inland Sea, is surrounded by sand dunes and is accessible only through the desert, making it one of the few places in the world where the sea meets the dunes. The reserve is a habitat for a variety of wildlife, including migratory birds, marine species, and desert fauna. Recognized for its pristine environment and ecological importance, Khor Al-Adaid has been designated as a natural reserve to ensure the conservation of its unique landscape and biodiversity.
National Museum of Qatar (NMoQ)		Doha Municipality	iv, vi (cultural)	2025	The National Museum of Qatar was established in 1970s and expanded in 2019. Its development reflects Qatari heritage while integrating modern elements.
