= List of intangible cultural heritage elements in Japan =

The United Nations Educational, Scientific and Cultural Organisation (UNESCO) intangible cultural heritage elements are the non-physical traditions and practices performed by a people. As part of a country's cultural heritage, they include celebrations, festivals, performances, oral traditions, music, and the making of handicrafts. The "intangible cultural heritage" is defined by the Convention for the Safeguarding of Intangible Cultural Heritage, drafted in 2003 and took effect in 2006. Inscription of new heritage elements on the UNESCO Intangible Cultural Heritage Lists is determined by the Intergovernmental Committee for the Safeguarding of Intangible Cultural Heritage, an organisation established by the convention.

Japan ratified the convention on 15 June 2004.

== Intangible cultural heritage of humanity ==
+ Transnational element

=== Representative List ===
Name	Image	Year	No.	Description
Kabuki theatre		2008	00163	Kabuki (歌舞伎, かぶき) is a classical form of Japanese theatre, mixing dramatic performance with traditional dance.
Ningyo Johruri Bunraku puppet theatre		2008	00064	Bunraku (文楽), also known as Ningyō jōruri (人形浄瑠璃), is a form of traditional Japanese puppet theatre, founded in Osaka in the beginning of the 17th century.
Nōgaku theatre		2008	00012	Nōgaku (能楽) is one of the traditional styles of Japanese theater. It is composed of the lyric drama noh (能), and the comic theater kyōgen (狂言).
Traditional Ainu dance		2009	00278	Ainu people have no indigenous system of writing, and so have traditionally inherited the folklore and the laws of their culture orally, often through music.
Daimokutate		2009	00276	The Daimokutate (題目立) is a recitation show that is performed at Yahashira Shrine in Kami-fukawa village, near the city of Nara.
Dainichido Bugaku		2009	00275	Dainichido Bugaku (大日堂舞楽) is a yearly set of nine sacred ritual dances and music. Instruments include the flute and taiko.
Akiu no Taue Odori		2009	00273	Akiu no Taue Odori (秋保の田植踊) is a traditional rice-planting dance in Akiu.
Hayachine kagura		2009	00272	Hayachine kagura (早池峰神楽) is a ritual dance, or kagura, in Shinto ceremonies, which is composed of a series of twelve dances. It is performed on 1 August at Hayachine Shrine in Hanamaki.
Oku-noto no Aenokoto		2009	00271	Oku-noto no Aenokoto (奥能登のあえのこと) is a ritual passed down from generation to generation by farmers in the Noto Peninsula. Aenokoto means "banquet ritual".
Ojiya-chijimi, Echigo-jofu: techniques of making ramie fabric in Uonuma region, Niigata Prefecture	Ojiya-chijimi	2009	00266	Ojiya-chijimi (小千谷縮) from Ojiya and Echigo-jofu (越後上布) from Echigo are two traditional fabrics woven with fine bast fiber from the ramie plant.
Gagaku		2009	00265	Gagaku (雅楽) is a type of Japanese classical music that was historically used for imperial court music and dances.
Yūki-tsumugi, silk fabric production technique		2010	00406	Yūki-tsumugi (結城紬) is a variety of silk cloth produced chiefly in Yūki.
Kumiodori, traditional Okinawan musical theatre		2010	00405	Kumi odori (組踊) is a form of narrative traditional Ryūkyūan dance.
Sada Shin Noh, sacred dancing at Sada shrine, Shimane		2011	00412	Sada Shin Noh are ritual purification dances performed annually on 24–25 September in the Sada Shrine.
Mibu no Hana Taue, ritual of transplanting rice in Mibu, Hiroshima		2011	00411	Mibu no Hana Taue (壬生の花田植) is ritual of transplanting rice that is held every year on the first Sunday of June in Kitahiroshima, in hopes of a good harvest.
Nachi no Dengaku, a religious performing art held at the Nachi fire festival		2012	00413	Dengaku (田楽) were rustic celebrations that developed as a musical accompaniment to rice planting observances. The Nachi Fire Festival is a part of the Kumano Nachi Shrine's annual celebrations.
Washoku, traditional dietary cultures of the Japanese, notably for the celebration of New Year	New Year special dishes	2013	00869	The word washoku (和食) is now the common word for traditional Japanese cooking.
Washi, craftsmanship of traditional Japanese hand-made paper		2014	02291	Washi (和紙) is traditional Japanese paper processed by hand using fibers from the inner bark of the gampi tree, the mitsumata shrub, or the paper mulberry (kōzo) bush.
Yama, Hoko, Yatai, float festivals in Japan		2016	02292	Thirty-three float festivals around Japan held annually to pray to the gods for peace and protection from natural disasters.
Raiho-shin, ritual visits of deities in masks and costumes		2018	01271	Visiting deity (raihoshin) event in which men representing the deity toshidon dress in straw raincoats decorated with leaves and masks with long pointed noses and demonic horns. Visiting the houses they scold the children and preach good behaviour.
Traditional skills, techniques and knowledge for the conservation and transmission of wooden architecture in Japan		2020	02293	Japanese architecture has been typified by wooden structures, elevated slightly off the ground, with tiled or thatched roofs.
Furyu-odori, ritual dances imbued with people’s hopes and prayers		2022	01701	Fūryū odori (風流踊) are traditional folk dances often consisting of large processions of participants typically wearing colorful costumes and accompanied by props.
Traditional knowledge and skills of sake-making with koji mold in Japan		2024	01977	Sake (酒) is a rice wine traditionally made from rice, water, and Kōji (麹) mold.

== See also ==
- List of World Heritage Sites in Japan
- Intangible Cultural Property (Japan)
- List of Important Intangible Folk Cultural Properties
