= Intangible cultural property (Japan) =

An intangible cultural property (無形文化財, mukei bunkazai), as defined by the Japanese government's Law for the Protection of Cultural Properties (1950), is a part of the cultural properties of high historical or artistic value such as drama, music, and craft techniques. The term refers exclusively to human skills possessed by individuals or groups which are indispensable to produce cultural properties.

Items of particular importance can be designated as important intangible cultural properties (重要無形文化財, jūyō mukei bunkazai). Recognition is also given to the owners of an item to encourage its transmission. There are three types of recognition: individual recognition, collective recognition, and group recognition. Special grants of two million yen a year are given to individual holders (the Living National Treasures) to help protect their properties. The government also contributes part of the expenses incurred either by the holder of an intangible cultural property during training of his successor, or by a recognized group for public performances.

To promote the understanding, and therefore the transmission across generations, of cultural properties, exhibitions concerning them are organized. The government through the Japan Arts Council also holds training workshops and other activities to educate future generations of Noh, bunraku, and kabuki personnel.

== Important intangible cultural properties ==
=== Performance traditions ===
Type	Name	Comments	Registered	Image
Ko-ryū	Tenshin Shōden Katori Shintō-ryū (天真正伝香取神道流)		1960	
Gagaku	Gagaku (雅楽)	Inscribed on the UNESCO Representative List of the Intangible Cultural Heritage of Humanity in 2009	1955	
Noh	Kyōgen (狂言)		1967	
Noh	Shite-kata (能シテ方)		1955	
Noh	Waki-kata (能ワキ方)		1994	
Noh	Nōgaku (能楽)	Inscribed on the UNESCO Representative List of the Intangible Cultural Heritage of Humanity in 2008	1957	
Noh	Hayashi-kata: kotsuzumi (能囃子方小鼓)		1998	
Noh	Hayashi-kata: taiko (能囃子方太鼓)		1992	
Noh	Hayashi-kata: ōtsuzumi (能囃子方大鼓)		1998	
Noh	Hayashi-kata: fue (能囃子方笛)		2009	
Bunraku	Ningyō jōruri bunraku (人形浄瑠璃文楽)	Inscribed on the UNESCO Representative List of the Intangible Cultural Heritage of Humanity in 2008	1955	
Bunraku	Shamisen (人形浄瑠璃文楽三味線)		1985	
Bunraku	Ningyō (人形浄瑠璃文楽人形)		1977	
Bunraku	Tayū (人形浄瑠璃文楽太夫)		1971	
Kabuki	Kabuki (歌舞伎)	Inscribed on the UNESCO Representative List of the Intangible Cultural Heritage of Humanity in 2008	1965	
Kabuki	Nagauta (歌舞伎音楽長唄)		1998	
Kabuki	Hayashi (歌舞伎音楽囃子)		1998	
Kabuki	Tachiyaku (歌舞伎立役)		1960	
Kabuki	Wakiyaku (歌舞伎脇役)		1997	
Kumiodori	Kumiodori (組踊)	Inscribed on the UNESCO Representative List of the Intangible Cultural Heritage of Humanity in 2010	1972	
Kumiodori	Uta – sanshin (組踊音楽歌三線)		2005	
Kumiodori	Tachikata (組踊立方)		2006	
Music	Itchū-bushi (一中節)		1993	
Music	Itchū-bushi shamisen (一中節三味線)		2001	
Music	Itchū-bushi jōruri (一中節浄瑠璃)		1999	
Music	Ogie-bushi (荻江節)		1993	
Music	Katō-bushi (河東節)		1993	
Music	Katō-bushi shamisen (河東節三味線)		2009	
Music	Katō-bushi jōruri (河東節三味線)		1994	
Music	Gidayū-bushi (義太夫節)		1980	
Music	Gidayū-bushi shamisen (義太夫節三味線)		1998	
Music	Gidayū-bushi jōruri (義太夫節浄瑠璃)		1999	
Music	Miyazono-bushi (宮薗節)		1993	
Music	Miyazono-bushi jōruri (宮薗節浄瑠璃)		2007	
Music	Shakuhachi (尺八)		1982	
Music	Tokiwazu-bushi (常磐津節)		2007	
Music	Tokiwazu-bushi shamisen (常磐津節三味線)		1992	
Music	Tokiwazu-bushi jōruri (常磐津節浄瑠璃)		1995	
Music	Shinnai-bushi shamisen (新内節三味線)		2001	
Music	Shinnai-bushi jōruri (新内節浄瑠璃)		2001	
Music	Kiyomoto-bushi shamisen (清元節三味線)		2003	
Music	Kiyomoto-bushi jōruri (清元節浄瑠璃)		2003	
Music	Jiuta (地歌)		2009	
Music	Nagauta (長唄唄)		1974	
Music	Nagauta shamisen (長唄三味線)		1987	
Music	Nagauta narimono (長唄鳴物)		1993	
Music	Ryūkyū's classical music (琉球古典音楽)		2000	
Music	Sōkyoku (箏曲)		1993	
Buyō	Kabuki-buyō (歌舞伎舞踊)		1955	
Buyō	Kyō-buyō (京舞)		2015	
Buyō	Ryūkyū-buyō (琉球舞踊)		2009	
Entertainment	Classic Rakugo (古典落語)		1995	
Entertainment	Kōdan (講談)		2002	

=== Crafts ===
Medium	Name	Comments	Region	Registered	Image
Ceramics	Bizen-yaki (備前焼)	High-fired, unglazed stoneware; one of the six ancient kilns; production in and around Imbe village from the twelfth century	Okayama Prefecture	2004	
Ceramics	Hakuji (白磁)	Undecorated white porcelain; influenced by Chinese examples; production began in the Arita area in the first half of the seventeenth century		1995	
Ceramics	Iro-Nabeshima (色鍋島)	A type of iro-e overglaze enamel, often with a blue under-glaze; from the domain of the Nabeshima clan; production from the second half of the seventeenth century	Saga Prefecture	1976	
Ceramics	Kakiemon (nigoshide) (柿右衛門 (濁手))	A type of iro-e overglaze enamel; created by Sakaida Kakiemon in the 1640s; nigoshide, the white ground against which the enamels are applied, was revived by Sakaida Kakiemon XII in the 1950s	Saga Prefecture	1971	
Ceramics	Mumyōi-yaki (無名異焼)	Mumyōi is the red ferrous clay of Sado island; production in Aikawa from the early nineteenth century	Niigata Prefecture	2003	
Ceramics	Onta ware (小鹿田焼)	Thick slipware; production in Hita from the early eighteenth century; one of the 100 Soundscapes of Japan	Ōita Prefecture	1995	
Ceramics	Seto-guro (瀬戸黒)	Black Seto; the colour is obtained by removing the glazed vessel from the kiln at the height of firing and cooling it rapidly; production in Mino Province from the late sixteenth century	Gifu Prefecture		
Ceramics	Seiji (青磁)	The pale-green colour of celadon is obtained from a feldspathic glaze and reduction firing; introduced from the continent		2007	
Ceramics	Shino (志野)	Stoneware with a white feldspathic glaze; production in Mino Province from the late sixteenth century	Gifu Prefecture	1994	
Ceramics	Tetsuyū-tōki (鉄釉陶器)	Iron-glaze stoneware		2005	
Ceramics	Yūri-kinsai (釉裏金彩)	Gold leaf or gold enamel is applied to a glazed surface which is then glazed and fired again, enhancing the durability of the decoration		2001	
Textiles	Ise-katagami (伊勢型紙)	Paper stencils	Mie Prefecture	1993	
Textiles	Kijōka-bashōfu (喜如嘉の芭蕉布)	banana fibre cloth	Okinawa Prefecture	1974	
Textiles	Kumejima-tsumugi (久米島紬)	pongee/kasuri	Okinawa Prefecture	2004	
Textiles	Kurume-kasuri (久留米絣)		Fukuoka Prefecture	1957	
Textiles	Miyako-jōfu (宮古上布)		Okinawa Prefecture	1978	
Textiles	Tate-nishiki (経錦)	Vertical brocade of ancient origin, revived by Kitamura Takeshi		2000	
Textiles	Yūki-tsumugi (結城紬)	Inscribed on the UNESCO Representative List of the Intangible Cultural Heritage of Humanity in 2010		1956	
Textiles	Kenjō Hakata weave (献上博多織)		Fukuoka Prefecture	2003	
Textiles	Edo komon (江戸小紋)	Edo fine pattern; stencil resist dyeing technique popular in the Edo period		1978	
Textiles	Bingata (紅型)	Stencil or resist paste weave; in the eighteenth century its use by commoners was restricted	Okinawa Prefecture	1996	
Textiles	Saga-nishiki (佐賀錦)	Brocade that developed in the early nineteenth century and was widespread by the early twentieth	Saga Prefecture	1994	
Textiles	Embroidery (刺繍, Shishū)			1997	
Textiles	Shuri weave (首里の織物)		Okinawa Prefecture	1998	
Textiles	Ojiya-chijimi – Echigo-jōfu (小千谷縮・越後上布)	Inscribed on the UNESCO Representative List of the Intangible Cultural Heritage of Humanity in 2009	Niigata Prefecture	1955	
Textiles	Seigō Sendai-hira (精好仙台平)		Miyagi Prefecture	2002	
Textiles	Tsumugi weave (紬織)	Woven from hand-spun silk floss		1990	
Textiles	Bashōfu (芭蕉布)	Bashō-fibre cloth	Okinawa Prefecture	2000	
Textiles	Mokuhanzuri-sarasa (木版摺更紗)			2008	
Textiles	Monsha (紋紗)	Figured gauze weave silk			
Textiles	Yūzen (友禅)	Paste-resist dyeing; perfected around 1700 by Miyazaki Yūzen		1955	
Textiles	Yūsoku weave (有職織物)			1999	
Textiles	Ra (羅)	A form of gauze weave; examples are found in the Shōsōin		1995	
Lacquerware	Chinkin (沈金)	Incised and filled with gold leaf or powder applied over wet lacquer; popular in China from the Song dynasty and particularly associated with Wajima ware		1999	
Lacquerware	Kinma (蒟醤)	Incised and colour-filled; introduced from the continent, prized in the Muromachi period, and perfected around Takamatsu in the Edo period		1985	
Lacquerware	Kyūshitsu (髹漆)	Sequential lacquering technique with four main phases: substrate, priming, intermediate coating, and top coating		1974	
Lacquerware	Maki-e (蒔絵)	Sprinkled picture decoration using metallic powder or pigment; dates to the Heian period		1955	
Lacquerware	Raden (螺鈿)	Shell (Mother-of-pearl, abalone, nautilus) inlay		1999	
Lacquerware	Wajima-nuri (輪島塗)	A mixture of burned diatomaceous earth, rice paste, and lacquer is used for the layers of undercoat; the earliest example, the doors of Juzo Jinja, date to 1524	Ishikawa Prefecture	1977	
Metalwork	Metal chasing (彫金, chōkin)	Several engraving techniques have been practised since the dōtaku of the Yayoi period		1978	
Metalwork	Metal casting (鋳金, chūkin)	Several casting techniques have been practised since the dōtaku of the Yayoi period, including lost-wax casting		1993	
Metalwork	Sword Polishing (刀剣研磨, tōken kenma)			1975	
Metalwork	Dora (銅鑼)	Gongs		2002	
Metalwork	Repoussé (鍛金, tankin)			1995	
Woodworking	Bamboo-work (竹工芸 ちくこうげい)			1982	
Woodworking	Wood-work (木工芸 もくこうげい)			1984	
Dolls	Ishō-ningyō (衣裳人形)	Costume dolls, dressed in tailored clothing made from dyed and woven textiles		1986	
Dolls	Tōso-ningyō (桐塑人形)	Paulownia sawdust, mixed with wheat starch and plum paste, is used to form a plaster for casting; once dry it is hard enough to be sculpted		2002	
Washi	Echizen-hōsho (越前奉書)	High-quality paper, used for official orders since the Muromachi period; paper-making in the region is known from the Engishiki	Fukui Prefecture	2000	
Washi	Hon-Minogami (本美濃紙)	Mulberry paper from Mino Province; records in the Shōsō-in refer to three paper-making regions: Chikuzen Province, Buzen Province, and Mino Province	Gifu Prefecture	1969	
Washi	Hosokawa-shi (細川紙)			1978	
Washi	Najio-ganpishi (名塩雁皮紙)	Made from the ganpi plant	Hyōgo Prefecture	2002	
Washi	Sekishū-banshi (石州半紙)	The strongest paper produced in Japan; used for shōji, calligraphy, and conservation-restoration; inscribed on the UNESCO Representative List of the Intangible Cultural Heritage of Humanity in 2009	Shimane Prefecture	1969	
Washi	Tosa-tengujōshi (土佐典具帖紙)	A very fine, strong paper developed around 1900 by Genta Yoshii	Kōchi Prefecture	2001	

== See also ==
- For lists of holders of Important Intangible Cultural Properties, see List of Living National Treasures of Japan (crafts) and List of Living National Treasures of Japan (performing arts)
- Cultural Properties of Japan
- List of Traditional Crafts of Japan
- List of Intangible Cultural Heritage elements in Japan
