= Ojiya-chijimi =

Hemp woven in Niigata, Japan

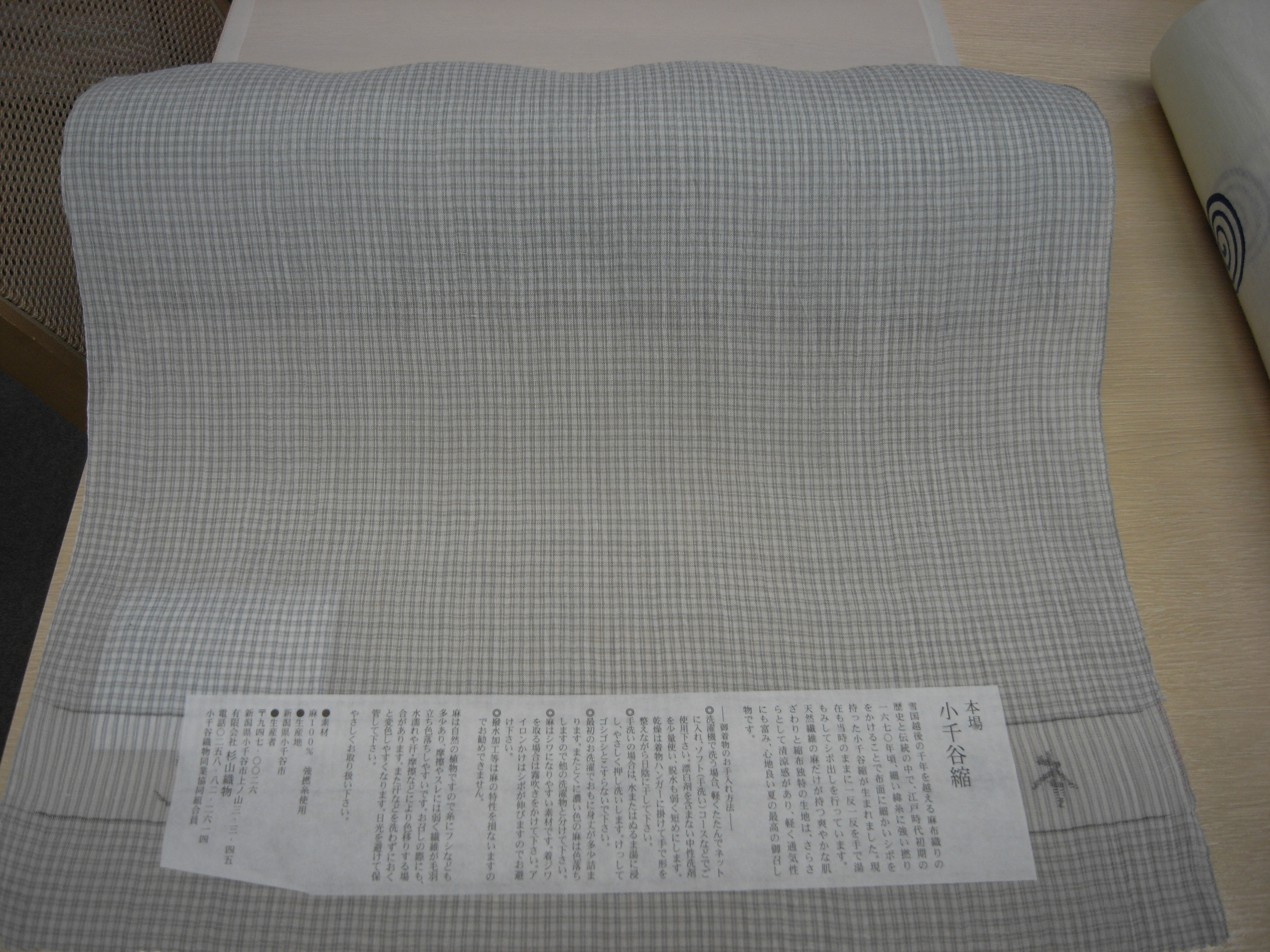
- Ojiya-chijimi
- Type: Fabric
- Material: Ramie
- Production method: Weaving
- Production process: Craft production
- Place of origin: Ojiya, Japan

Ojiya-chijimi (Japanese: 小千谷縮) is a Hemp that is woven mainly in Ojiya, Niigata in Japan. It is a fabric using Ramie (Ramie fabric). It was designated as an Important Intangible Cultural Property in 1955, and was registered as a Intangible cultural heritage along with Echigo-jofu in 2009.

== See also ==
- Echigo-jofu
