= List of Intangible Cultural Heritage elements in the United Arab Emirates =

The United Nations Educational, Scientific and Cultural Organisation (UNESCO) intangible cultural heritage elements are the non-physical traditions and practices performed by a people. As part of a country's cultural heritage, they include celebrations, festivals, performances, oral traditions, music, and the making of handicrafts. The "intangible cultural heritage" is defined by the Convention for the Safeguarding of Intangible Cultural Heritage, drafted in 2003 and took effect in 2006. Inscription of new heritage elements on the UNESCO Intangible Cultural Heritage Lists is determined by the Intergovernmental Committee for the Safeguarding of Intangible Cultural Heritage, an organisation established by the convention.

The United Arab Emirates signed the convention on 2 May 2005.

== Intangible Cultural Heritage of Humanity ==
+ Transnational element

=== Representative List ===
Name	Image	Year	No.	Description
Al-Taghrooda, traditional Bedouin chanted poetry in the United Arab Emirates and the Sultanate of Oman + (Note: Shared with Oman.)		2012	00744	
Al-Ayyala, a traditional performing art of the Sultanate of Oman and the United Arab Emirates + (Note: Shared with Oman.)		2014	01012	Al-Ayyala is a weapon dance traditionally performed during weddings, celebrations, and other events.
Majlis, a cultural and social space + (Note: Shared with Oman, Qatar, and Saudi Arabia.)		2015	01076	Majlis –meaning "sitting room"– is a meeting place for society's individuals to debate matters and local issues, and exchanging news whether public affairs news or what concern the attendees.
Arabic coffee, a symbol of generosity + (Note: Shared with Oman, Qatar, Jordan, and Saudi Arabia.)		2015	02111	
Al-Razfa, a traditional performing art + (Note: Shared with Oman.)		2015	01078	
Camel racing, a social practice and a festive heritage associated with camels + (Note: Shared with Oman.)		2020	01576	
Al Aflaj, traditional irrigation network system in the UAE, oral traditions, knowledge and skills of construction, maintenance and equitable water distribution		2020	01577	
Falconry, a living human heritage + (Note: Shared with Austria, Belgium, Croatia, Czechia, France, Germany, Hungary, Ireland, Italy, Kazakhstan, Republic of Korea, Kyrgyzstan, Mongolia, Morocco, Netherlands, Pakistan, Poland, Portugal, Qatar, Slovakia, Saudi Arabia, Spain, and Syria.)		2021	01708	The origin of falconry goes back to the use of hunting by birds of prey as a mean of hunting but it has evolved over time to become part of the cultural heritage of the people.
Arabic calligraphy: knowledge, skills and practices + (Note: Shared with Algeria, Bahrain, Egypt, Iraq, Jordan, Kuwait, Lebanon, Mauritania, Morocco, Oman, Palestine, Saudi Arabia, Sudan, Tunisia, and Yemen.)		2021	01718	The artistic practice of writing Arabic letters and words to convey grace and beauty.
Al Talli, traditional embroidery skills in the United Arab Emirates		2022	01712	
Alheda'a, oral traditions of calling camel flocks + (Note: Shared with Oman and Saudi Arabia.)		2022	01717	Alheda'a is an oral tradition of calling a flock of camels passed on through generations.
Date palm, knowledge, skills, traditions and practices + (Note: Shared with Bahrain, Egypt, Iraq, Jordan, Kuwait, Mauritania, Morocco, Oman, Palestine, Qatar, Saudi Arabia, Sudan, Tunisia, and Yemen.)		2022	01902	The Palm tree is considered to be a part of the history of the countries where it is a source for farmers, craftsmen, handicrafts owners, merchants, factory owners and food companies.
Harees dish: know-how, skills and practices + (Note: Shared with Oman and Saudi Arabia.)		2023	01744	Harees, is a dish of boiled, cracked, or coarsely-ground cracked wheat or bulgur, mixed with meat and seasoned.
Henna, rituals, aesthetic and social practices + (Note: Shared with Algeria, Saudi Arabia, Bahrain, Egypt, Palestine, Iraq, Jordan, Kuwait, Morocco, Mauritania, Oman, Qatar, Sudan, Tunisia, and Yemen.)		2024	02116	A temporary tattooing practice with medicinal and aesthetic motivations.
Bisht (men's Abaa): skills and practices + (Note: Shared with Bahrain, Iraq, Jordan, Kuwait, Oman, Qatar, Syria, and Saudi Arabia.)		2025	02233	A bisht is a traditional men's cloak popular in the Arab world for hundreds of years.
The zaffa in the traditional wedding + (Note: Shared with Djibouti, Comoros, Iraq, Jordan, Mauritania, and Somalia.)		2025	02283	The zaffa, or wedding march, is a musical procession of bendir drums, bagpipes, horns, belly dancers, and men carrying flaming swords.
Al Sadu, traditional weaving skills in the United Arab Emirates		2025	02223	Al Sadu, or simply Sadu, describes an embroidery form in geometrical shapes hand-woven by Bedouin people.
Al Ahalla, a living performing art in the United Arab Emirates		2025	02279	Al Ahalla is a traditional art form that blends performing arts with oral tradition.
Arabic Kohl + (Note: Shared with Iraq, Jordan, Libya, Oman, Palestine, Saudi Arabia, Syria, and Tunisia.)		2025	02261	Kohl is a fine black powder used as eyeliner traditionally made by crushing stibnite.

=== Elements in Need of Urgent Safeguarding ===
Name	Year	No.	Description
Al Azi, art of performing praise, pride and fortitude poetry	2017	01268	

=== Good Safeguarding Practices ===
Name	Year	No.	Description
Al Sadu, traditional weaving skills in the United Arab Emirates	2025	02473	Between 2011 and 2023, a safeguarding programme was put in place to address the risk of disappearance of this cultural element.

== See also ==
- List of World Heritage Sites in the United Arab Emirates
