= List of Intangible Cultural Heritage elements in Oman =

The United Nations Educational, Scientific and Cultural Organisation (UNESCO) intangible cultural heritage elements are the non-physical traditions and practices performed by a people. As part of a country's cultural heritage, they include celebrations, festivals, performances, oral traditions, music, and the making of handicrafts. The "intangible cultural heritage" is defined by the Convention for the Safeguarding of Intangible Cultural Heritage, drafted in 2003 and took effect in 2006. Inscription of new heritage elements on the UNESCO Intangible Cultural Heritage Lists is determined by the Intergovernmental Committee for the Safeguarding of Intangible Cultural Heritage, an organisation established by the convention.

Oman signed the convention on 4 August 2005.

== Intangible Cultural Heritage of Humanity ==
+ Transnational element

=== Representative List ===
Name	Image	Year	No.	Description
Al-Bar'ah, music and dance of Oman Dhofari valleys		2010	00372	Al-Bar'ah from the Dhofar Mountains is a dance of two or four bedouins swaying a Khanjar dagger, accompanied by drums, flute and song.
Al-Taghrooda, traditional Bedouin chanted poetry in the United Arab Emirates and the Sultanate of Oman + (Note: Shared with United Arab Emirates.)		2012	00744	Al-Taghrooda is a camel rider's song of seven verses, performed in two antiphonal groups.
Al 'azi, elegy, processional march and poetry		2012	00850	Al 'azi is performed solo by a lead singer brandishing a sword. The group following him replies with single notes.
Al-Ayyala, a traditional performing art of the Sultanate of Oman and the United Arab Emirates + (Note: Shared with United Arab Emirates.)		2014	01012	Al-Ayyala is a weapon dance traditionally performed during weddings, celebrations, and other events.
Majlis, a cultural and social space + (Note: Shared with Qatar, Saudi Arabia, and United Arab Emirates.)		2015	01076	Majlis –meaning "sitting room"– is a meeting place for society's individuals to debate matters and local issues, and exchanging news whether public affairs news or what concern the attendees.
Arabic coffee, a symbol of generosity + (Note: Shared with Qatar, Saudi Arabia, Jordan, and United Arab Emirates.)		2015	02111	Serving qahwa is an important part of hospitality. It is prepared in front of the guests, starting with roasting the beans. It is bitter and served without sugar.
Al-Razfa, a traditional performing art + (Note: Shared with United Arab Emirates.)		2015	01078	Between two rows of men with symbolic rifles is room for dancers, accompanied by antiphonal singing.
Horse and camel Ardhah		2018	01359	ardhah is the art of instructing a horse or camel for work. It is frequently presented at Alardha festivals.
Camel racing, a social practice and a festive heritage associated with camels + (Note: Shared with United Arab Emirates.)		2020	01576	
Arabic calligraphy: knowledge, skills and practices + (Note: Shared with Algeria, Bahrain, Egypt, Iraq, Jordan, Kuwait, Lebanon, Mauritania, Morocco, Palestine, Saudi Arabia, Sudan, Tunisia, United Arab Emirates, and Yemen.)		2021	01718	The artistic practice of writing Arabic letters and words to convey grace and beauty.
Alheda'a, oral traditions of calling camel flocks + (Note: Shared with Saudi Arabia and United Arab Emirates.)		2022	01717	Alheda'a is an oral tradition of calling a flock of camels passed on through generations.
Al-Khanjar, craft skills and social practices		2022	01844	A khanjar is a traditional dagger worn by men for ceremonial occasions, it is a short curved blade shaped like the letter "J" and resembles a hook.
Date palm, knowledge, skills, traditions and practices + (Note: Shared with Bahrain, Egypt, Iraq, Jordan, Kuwait, Mauritania, Morocco, Palestine, Qatar, Saudi Arabia, Sudan, Tunisia, United Arab Emirates, and Yemen.)		2022	01902	The Palm tree is considered to be a part of the history of the countries where it is a source for farmers, craftsmen, handicrafts owners, merchants, factory owners and food companies.
Harees dish: know-how, skills and practices + (Note: Shared with Saudi Arabia and United Arab Emirates.)		2023	01744	Harees, is a dish of boiled, cracked, or coarsely-ground cracked wheat or bulgur, mixed with meat and seasoned.
Henna, rituals, aesthetic and social practices + (Note: Shared with Algeria, Saudi Arabia, Bahrain, Egypt, United Arab Emirates, Iraq, Jordan, Kuwait, Morocco, Mauritania, Palestine, Qatar, Sudan, Tunisia, and Yemen.)		2024	02116	A temporary tattooing practice with medicinal and aesthetic motivations.
Bisht (men's Abaa): skills and practices + (Note: Shared with Bahrain, Iraq, Jordan, Kuwait, Qatar, Saudi Arabia, Syria, and the United Arab Emirates.)		2025	02233	A bisht is a traditional men's cloak popular in the Arab world for hundreds of years.
Arabic Kohl + (Note: Shared with Iraq, Jordan, Libya, Palestine, Saudi Arabia, Syria, Tunisia, and the United Arab Emirates.)		2025	02261	Kohl is a fine black powder used as eyeliner traditionally made by crushing stibnite.

=== Good Safeguarding Practices ===
Name	Year inscribed	No.	Description
Oman Youth Sail Training Ship (Safinat Shabab Oman) programme for peace and sustainable cultural dialogue	2024	02080	

== See also ==
- List of World Heritage Sites in Oman
