= List of Intangible Cultural Heritage elements in Rwanda =

The United Nations Educational, Scientific and Cultural Organisation (UNESCO) intangible cultural heritage elements are the non-physical traditions and practices performed by a people. As part of a country's cultural heritage, they include celebrations, festivals, performances, oral traditions, music, and the making of handicrafts. The "intangible cultural heritage" is defined by the Convention for the Safeguarding of Intangible Cultural Heritage, drafted in 2003 and took effect in 2006. Inscription of new heritage elements on the UNESCO Intangible Cultural Heritage Lists is determined by the Intergovernmental Committee for the Safeguarding of Intangible Cultural Heritage, an organisation established by the convention.

Rwanda ratified the convention on 21 January 2013.

== Intangible Cultural Heritage of Humanity ==
=== Representative List ===
Name	Image	Year	No.	Description
Intore		2024	02129	A traditional Rwandan dance performed by a troupe, inscribed at the 19th session of the Intergovernmental Committee in December 2024.

== See also ==
- Culture of Rwanda
- List of World Heritage Sites in Rwanda
