= Snow bleaching =

Bleaching with ozone

Snow bleaching is a technique used in traditional Japanese textile industry to bleach the fabric using the ozone evaporating from snow. This technique is used to bleach Echigo-jofu, a type of kimono. This method is based on the fact that ozone is released when snow evaporates due to sunlight.
