= Seigo =

- Gender: Male

Origin
- Origin: Japanese
- Meaning: Different meanings depending on the kanji used

Seigo (written: 誠吾, 斉吾 or 省吾) is a masculine Japanese given name. Notable people with the name include:

- Seigo Asada (浅田 斉吾; born 1980), Japanese darts player
- Seigo Kitamura (北村 誠吾; born 1947), Japanese politician
- Seigo Minami (皆見 省吾; 1893–1975), Japanese dermatologist
- Seigo Nakao, head of Japanese Studies at Oakland University
- Seigo Shimokawa (下川 誠吾; born 1975), Japanese footballer

Seigō or Seigou (written: 正剛, 成豪, 制剛 or 聖剛) is a separate masculine given name, though it may be romanized the same way. Notable people with the name include:

- Seigo Kobayashi (小林 成豪; born 1994), Japanese footballer
- Seigō Nakano (中野 正剛; 1886–1943), Japanese politician
- Seigo Narazaki (楢﨑 正剛; born 1976), Japanese footballer
- Seigo Saito (齋藤 制剛; born 1977), Japanese judoka
- Seigo Tada (多田 正剛; 1922–1997), founder of Goju-Ryu Seigokan Karatedo
- Seigo Yamamoto (山本 聖剛; born 1971), Japanese drift driver

== See also ==
- Seigo Kosaku
