= List of Intangible Cultural Heritage elements in Nigeria =

The United Nations Educational, Scientific and Cultural Organisation (UNESCO) intangible cultural heritage elements are the non-physical traditions and practices performed by a people. As part of a country's cultural heritage, they include celebrations, festivals, performances, oral traditions, music, and the making of handicrafts. The "intangible cultural heritage" is defined by the Convention for the Safeguarding of Intangible Cultural Heritage, drafted in 2003 and took effect in 2006. Inscription of new heritage elements on the UNESCO Intangible Cultural Heritage Lists for their protection and safeguard is determined by the Intergovernmental Committee for the Safeguarding of Intangible Cultural Heritage, an organisation established by the convention.

Nigeria ratified the convention on 21 October 2005.

== Intangible Cultural Heritage of Humanity ==
+ Transnational element

=== Representative List ===
Name	Image	Year	No.	Description
Ifa divination system		2008	00146	Ifá is a geomantic system originating from Yorubaland.
Oral heritage of Gelede		2008	00002	The Gẹlẹdẹ spectacle of the Yoruba is a public display by colorful masks which combines art and ritual dance to amuse, educate and inspire worship.
Ijele masquerade		2009	00194	Ijele Masquerade, that is the biggest masquerade in Sub-Saharan Africa, is a tradition of the Igbo people.
Argungu international fishing and cultural festival		2016	00901	The Argungu Fishing Festival is an annual four-day festival.
Kwagh-Hir theatrical performance		2019	00683	Kwagh-Hir is a multipart culturally edifying art form of the Tiv people.
Sango Festival, Oyo		2023	01974	Sango Festival is an annual festival held among the Yoruba people in honour of Sango
Midwifery: knowledge, skills and practices + (Note: Shared with Colombia, Cyprus, Germany, Kyrgyzstan, Luxembourg, Slovenia, and Togo.)		2023	01968	A midwife is a health professional who cares for mothers and newborns.
Durbar in Kano		2024	01895	The Durbar festival in Kano is an annual cultural, religious and equestrian festival, celebrated as a core part of Hausa culture.

== See also ==
- List of World Heritage Sites in Nigeria
