= List of Intangible Cultural Heritage elements in Uzbekistan =

Location of Uzbekistan

The United Nations Educational, Scientific and Cultural Organization (UNESCO) defines intangible cultural heritage elements as non-physical traditions and practices performed by a people. As part of a country's cultural heritage, they include celebrations, festivals, performances, oral traditions, music, and the making of handicrafts. The term intangible cultural heritage is formally established by the Convention for the Safeguarding of the Intangible Cultural Heritage, which was drafted in 2003 and took effect in 2006. The inscription of new heritage elements on UNESCO's Intangible Cultural Heritage Lists for protection and safeguarding is determined by the Intergovernmental Committee for the Safeguarding of Intangible Cultural Heritage, an organization established by the Convention. Uzbekistan ratified the Convention on 29 January 2008.

National lists are required by the Convention for the further nomination of elements to the UNESCO lists.

== Intangible Cultural Heritage of Humanity ==
UNESCO's Intangible Cultural Heritage of Humanity consists of three lists: the Representative List of the Intangible Cultural Heritage of Humanity, the List of Intangible Cultural Heritage in Need of Urgent Safeguarding, and the Register of Good Safeguarding Practices. Uzbekistan has elements inscribed on all of the lists.

† Transnational element

=== Representative List ===
This list aims to represent the intangible cultural heritage of Uzbekistan worldwide and bring awareness to its significance.

Intangible Cultural Heritage elements recognized by UNESCO
Name	Media	Year	No.	Description
Shashmaqom music † (Note: Shared with Tajikistan)	People sitting in rows of chairs, listening to Shashmaqom being played	2008	00089	
Cultural space of Boysun District		2008	00019	
Katta Ashula		2009	00288	
Askiya, the art of wit		2014	00971	
Palov culture and tradition	Restaurant cooking palov for its customers in a large pan.	2016	01166	
Khorazm dance, Lazgi		2019	01364	
Art of miniature † (Note: Shared with Azerbaijan, Türkiye, and Iran.)		2020	01598	
Bakhshi art		2021	01706	
Telling tradition of Nasreddin Hodja/ Molla Nesreddin/ Molla Ependi/ Apendi/ Afendi Kozhanasyr Anecdotes † (Note: Shared with Azerbaijan, Kazakhstan, Kyrgyzstan, Tajikistan, Türkiye, and Turkmenistan.)	A 17th-century miniature of Nasruddin	2022	01705	
Sericulture and traditional production of silk for weaving † (Note: Shared with Afghanistan, Azerbaijan, Iran, Türkiye, Tajikistan, and Turkmenistan.)		2022	01890	
Iftar/Eftari/Iftar/Iftor and its socio-cultural traditions † (Note: Shared with Azerbaijan, Iran, and Türkiye.)		2023	01984	
Art of illumination: Təzhib/Tazhib/Zarhalkori/Tezhip/Naqqoshlik † (Note: Shared with Azerbaijan, Iran, Tajikistan and Türkiye.)		2023	01981	
Ceramic arts in Uzbekistan	Rows of vibrantly colored ceramic plates outside the Khanqah of Nodir Devonbegi in Bukhara	2023	01989	
Art of crafting and playing rubab/rabab † (Note: Shared with Afghanistan, Iran, and Tajikistan.)		2024	02143	
Nawrouz, Novruz, Nowrouz, Nowrouz, Nawrouz, Nauryz, Nooruz, Nowruz, Navruz, Nevruz, Nowruz, Navruz † (Note: Shared with Afghanistan, Azerbaijan, India, Iran, Iraq, Kazakhstan, Kyrgyzstan, Mongolia, Pakistan, Tajikistan, Turkey, and Turkmenistan.)	Girl with torch on mountainside	2024	02097	
Traditional knowledge and skills in making Kyrgyz, Kazakh and Karakalpak yurts (Turkic nomadic dwellings) † (Note: Shared with Kazakhstan and Kyrgyzstan.)	A Karakalpak bentwood type yurt inKarakalpakstan, Uzbekistan	2025	02284	

=== Need of Urgent Safeguarding ===
This list covers elements that are endangered and thus require appropriate safeguarding.

Endangered elements recognized by UNESCO
Name	Media	Year	No.	Description
Art of crafting and playing Kobyz	A wooden kobyz instrument on display	2025	02329	

=== Register of Good Safeguarding Practices ===
This list accredits programs and projects that safeguard intangible cultural heritage and express the principles of the Convention.

Good Safeguarding Practices recognized by UNESCO
Name	Media	Year	No.	Description
Margilan Crafts Development Centre, safeguarding of the atlas and adras making traditional technologies		2017	01254	

== See also ==
- List of World Heritage Sites in Uzbekistan
- Culture of Uzbekistan
- Tourism in Uzbekistan
