= List of World Heritage Sites in Nigeria =

Location of World Heritage Sites in Nigeria

The United Nations Educational, Scientific and Cultural Organization (UNESCO) World Heritage Sites are places of importance to cultural or natural heritage as described in the UNESCO World Heritage Convention, established in 1972. Cultural heritage consists of monuments (such as architectural works, monumental sculptures, or inscriptions), groups of buildings, and sites (including archaeological sites). Natural features (consisting of physical and biological formations), geological and physiographical formations (including habitats of threatened species of animals and plants), and natural sites which are important from the point of view of science, conservation or natural beauty, are defined as natural heritage. Nigeria accepted the convention on 23 October 1974, making its historical sites eligible for inclusion on the list. As of 2023, Nigeria has two World Heritage Sites. Nigeria has served as a member of the World Heritage Committee four times, 1976–1980, 2001–2005, 2007–2011, and 2019–2023.

== World Heritage Sites ==
UNESCO lists sites under ten criteria; each entry must meet at least one of the criteria. Criteria i through vi are cultural, and vii through x are natural.

World Heritage Sites
Site	Image	Location (state)	Year listed	UNESCO data	Description
Sukur Cultural Landscape	The granite throne of Bugu Festival Ground with trees in the background.	Adamawa	1999	iii, v, vi (cultural)	
Osun-Osogbo Sacred Grove		Osun	2005	ii, iii, vi (cultural)	

== Tentative List ==
In addition to sites inscribed on the World Heritage List, member states can maintain a list of tentative sites that they may consider for nomination. Nominations for the World Heritage List are only accepted if the site was previously listed on the tentative list. As of 2026, Nigeria has listed thirteen properties on its tentative list.

Tentative sites
Site	Image	Location (state)	Year listed	UNESCO criteria	Description
Benin Iya / Sungbo' s Eredo		Edo	1995	ii, iii, iv, v (cultural)	
Kwiambana and/or Ningi		Zamfara	1995	ii, iii, iv (cultural)	
Niger Delta Mangroves		Abia, Akwa Ibom, Bayelsa, Cross River, Delta, Edo, Imo, Ondo, Rivers	1995	Natural	
Oke Idanre (Idanre Hill)		Ondo	2007	ii, iii, v (cultural)	
Arochkwu Long Juju Slave Route (Cave Temple Complex)		Abia	2007	iii, vi (cultural)	
Ancient Kano City Walls and Associated Sites		Kano	2007	iii, v, vi (cultural)	
Surame Cultural Landscape		Sokoto	2007	i, vii (mixed)	
Alok Ikom Stone Monoliths		Cross River	2007	i, iii (cultural)	
Ogbunike Caves		Anambra	2007	vi, vii (mixed)	
Cross River-Korup-Takamanda		Cross River	2020	ix, x (natural)	
Lake Chad cultural landscape		Borno, Yobe	2018	ii, iii, vii, ix (mixed)	
Gashaka Gumti National Park		Adamawa, Taraba	2025	vii, ix, x (natural)	

== See also ==
- List of Intangible Cultural Heritage elements in Nigeria
