= List of Intangible Cultural Heritage elements in Brazil =

The United Nations Educational, Scientific and Cultural Organisation (UNESCO) intangible cultural heritage elements are the non-physical traditions and practices performed by a people. As part of a country's cultural heritage, they include celebrations, festivals, performances, oral traditions, music, and the making of handicrafts. The "intangible cultural heritage" is defined by the Convention for the Safeguarding of Intangible Cultural Heritage, drafted in 2003 and took effect in 2006. Inscription of new heritage elements on the UNESCO Intangible Cultural Heritage Lists for their protection and safeguard is determined by the Intergovernmental Committee for the Safeguarding of Intangible Cultural Heritage, an organisation established by the convention.

Brazil ratified the convention on 1 March 2006.

== Intangible Cultural Heritage of Humanity ==
+ Transnational element

=== Representative List ===
Name	Image	Year	No.	Description
Samba de Roda of the Recôncavo of Bahia		2008	00101	Samba de Roda ("Samba of the roda") is a traditional Afro-Brazilian dance that developed in Brazil’s Bahia’s Recôncavo region during the late 19th century.
Oral and graphic expressions of the Wajapi		2008	00049	Wayampi or Wayãpi are an Indigenous people located at the confluence of the rivers Camopi and Oyapock, and the basins of the Amapari and Carapanatuba Rivers in the central part of the states of Amapá and Pará.
Frevo, performing arts of the Carnival of Recife		2012	00603	Frevo is a dance and musical style originating from Recife (Pernambuco), traditionally associated with Brazilian Carnival.
Círio De Nazaré (The Taper of Our Lady of Nazareth) in the city of Belém, Pará		2013	00602	The Círio de Nazaré is a Catholic religious celebration, originating from Portuguese colonizers, involving processions (pilgrimages) in devotion to Our Lady of Nazareth, held in the Brazilian city of Belém (Pará).
Capoeira circle		2014	00892	In the capoeira circle, roles are interchangeable: observers can become participants, contestants become spectators, and musicians rotate.
Cultural Complex of Bumba-meu-boi from Maranhão		2019	01510	Bumba Meu Boi is an interactive play celebrated in Brazil, specially in Maranhão. It originated in the 18th century. It is a form of social criticism.
Traditional ways of making Artisan Minas Cheese in Minas Gerais		2024	02102	Minas cheese is a type of cheese that has been traditionally produced in the state of Minas Gerais.

=== Elements in Need of Urgent Safeguarding ===
Name	Year	No.	Description
Yaokwa, the Enawene Nawe people's ritual for the maintenance of social and cosmic order	2011	00521	The Enawene Nawe people live in the basin of the Juruena River. They perform the Yaokwa ritual every year during the drought period to honour the Yakairiti spirits.

=== Good Safeguarding Practices ===
Name	Year	No.	Description
Call for projects of the National Programme of Intangible Heritage	2011	00504	The Programa Nacional de Patrimônio Imaterial encourages and supports safeguarding initiatives and practices for the safeguarding of intangible cultural heritage.
Fandango's Living Museum	2011	00502	Fandango is a popular music and dance expression in coastal communities in southern and south-eastern Brazil.

== See also ==
- List of World Heritage Sites in Brazil
