= Kiyomoto =

Kiyomoto is both a Japanese surname and a masculine Japanese given name. Notable people with the name include:

Surname:

- Takumi Kiyomoto (清本 拓己, born 1993), Japanese footballer

Given name:

- Torii Kiyomoto (鳥居 清元, 1645–1702), Japanese kabuki actor

== See also ==
- 25075 Kiyomoto, main-belt minor planet
- Kiyomoto (music), a genre of traditional Japanese music
