= Japanese sword polishing =

Japanese sword blade and sharpening stone and water bucket at 2008 Cherry Blossom Festival, Seattle Center, Seattle, Washington

Sword polishing is part of Japanese swordsmithing where a blade is polished after forging. It gives the shining appearance and beauty to the sword.

== Polishing ==
When the rough blade is completed, the swordsmith turns the blade over to a polisher called a togishi, whose job it is to refine the shape of a blade and improve its aesthetic value. The entire process takes considerable time, in some cases easily up to several weeks. Early polishers used three types of stone, whereas a modern polisher generally uses seven. The modern high level of polish was not normally done before around 1600, since greater emphasis was placed on function over form. The polishing process almost always takes longer than even crafting, and a good polish can greatly improve the beauty of a blade, while a bad one can ruin the best of blades. More importantly, inexperienced polishers can permanently ruin a blade by badly disrupting its geometry or wearing down too much steel, both of which effectively destroy the sword's monetary, historic, artistic, and functional value.

On high quality blades, only the back of the blade and the adjacent sides (called the shinogi-ji), are polished to a mirror-like surface. To bring out the grain and hamon, the center portion of the blade (called the hira), and the edge (the ha), are usually given a matte finish. Microscopic scratches in the surface vary, depending on hardness. Smaller but more numerous scratches in the harder areas reflect light differently from the deeper, longer scratches in the softer areas. The harder metal appears more matte than the softer, and the manner in which it scatters light is less affected by the direction of the lighting.

== Stages ==
The process is divided into two stages: Shitaji togi (Foundation polishing) and Shiage togi (Finish polishing).

=== Shitaji togi ===
Shitaji togi sets the geometry of the blade and encompasses all main stages; utilizing large waterstones of increasingly finer grit. The sword is first inspected for straightness: If it isn't straight for whatever reasons, the duty of correcting it falls to the polisher. Straightening usually involves using wooden jigs to correct any bends in the blade. From this point on, a polisher works to form and grind surfaces and geometry as needed; note that these stages are also where damage is repaired through careful reshaping. The relatively small point area of the blade, the kissaki, is distinct enough that it must be worked on by dividing the polishing among smaller subregions. Any present hi (fullers) are also polished but not with the large main stones, instead a variety of methods are used including smaller-sized stones, a migaki-bo (hardened-steel burnishing needle) or even fine-grit sandpaper.

Artificial waterstones are nowadays used for the foundation polishing stage, but almost never used for finishing, as they will produce inferior results compared to natural stones.

=== Shiage togi ===
Shiage togi is the stage that places the mirrorlike finish on a blade; the most notable differences between this and the previous stage are that the stones are of considerably smaller size, and that the blade remains stationary, instead having the abrasives and tools moved over it. In this stage, a blade is painstakingly worked on section by section, using wafer-thin slices cut from the main stones. After this is done, the blade's look will still be slightly unbalanced, and is corrected with a special nugui mixture that adjusts it. This stage is also where the yokote line is brought out; it may be either artificial or following the existing line (more often than not however, they are usually lost during a prior polishing stage). The final major step involves fully burnishing the rear and sides.

The finishing process brings out and enhances all details of a blade so that they are readily visible for observation and analysis, which entails results that must be free of any visual imperfections.

=== Nakago filing ===
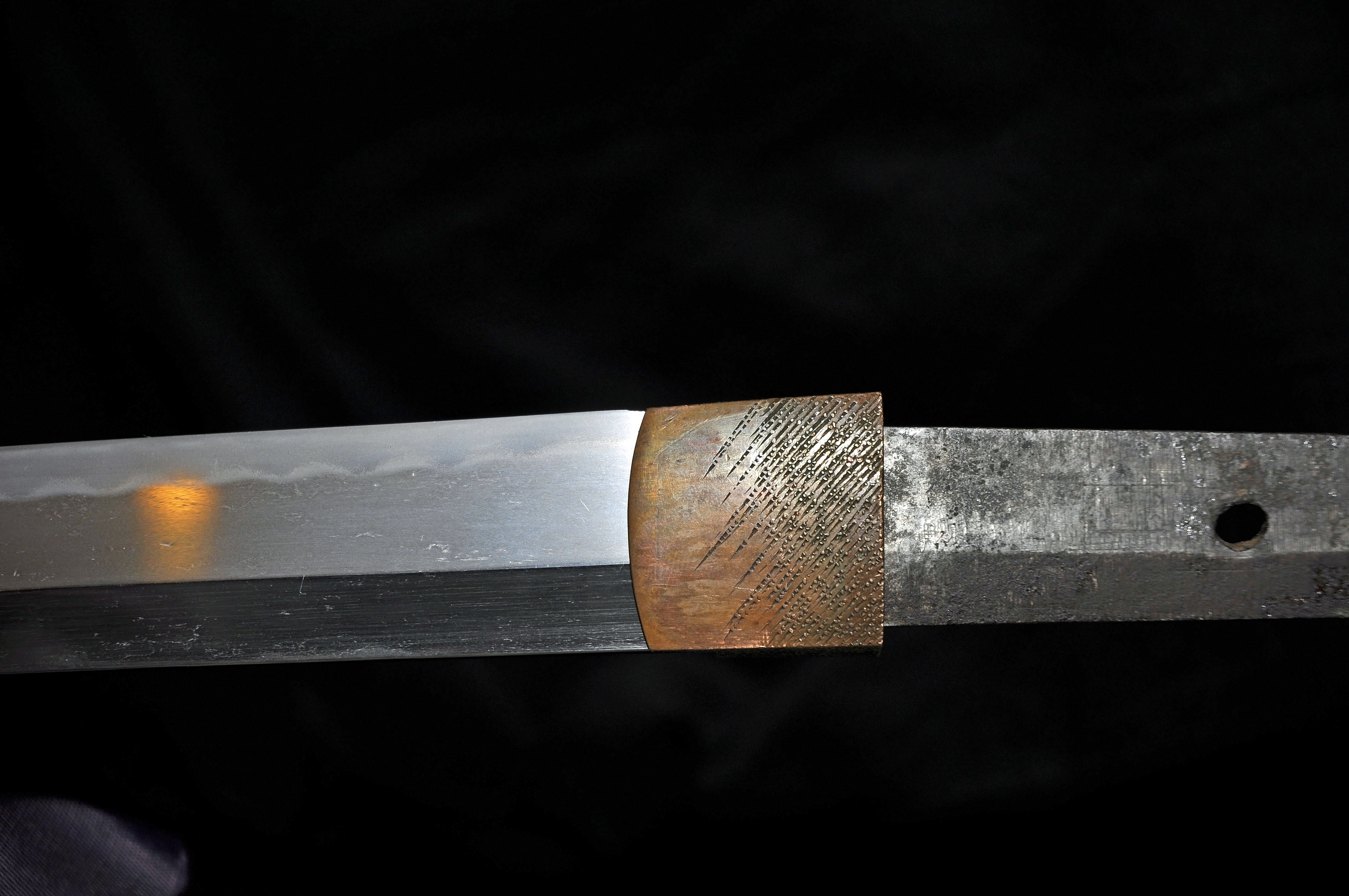
Nakago with mekugi-ana hole (right)(blade, left, and habaki, center) in unpolished state

The nakago is traditionally not polished and only partially finished with file marks, before being allowed to oxidize naturally. The file marks are to provide a friction-fit for the tsuka. The division line between the file markings and the highly polished blade are the machi and two ledges, the ha machi (blade junction – edge side), and the mune machi (blade junction – spine side), around which the fitted habaki is clasped.

== Hamon finishes ==
There are two main styles of hamon finishes, "hadori" and "sashikomi nugui".

=== Hadori ===
The hadori style is named after the hadori stone used, a waterstone selected for its slightly greater coarseness which helps lighten the hamon and make it stand out against surrounding areas. The hadori style cannot exactly replicate the hamon as the finishing is actually a trace of the original; thus its quality depends mainly on the nature of the hamon itself, available equipment and the skill of the polisher. This process is relatively new, having been developed in the past century.

=== Sashikomi nugui ===
The sashikomi nugui style is named after the nugui mixture used to produce the final effect. First, the entire hamon is run over by a hazuya stone, a process which also is done to the jihada as well. Next a jizuya stone is used to bring out the hada or grain of the blade. Sashikomi nugui is usually composed of magnetite or tsushima and other compounds depending upon the desired color for the jihada. The nugui mixture is applied to the whole blade and if properly done, the hamon will whiten slightly but surrounding areas will darken considerably. In this case, the hamon's appearance is exactly preserved. This process is normally only done on blades with well-defined hamons and grain patterns.

== Evaluation ==
Polishing is a crucial step in preparing a blade for analysis, since it brings out and enhances all external details as mentioned earlier. This is important because details such as the shape, geometry, particular proportions, appearance of the hamon and grain pattern and so on, are distinctive enough that they can be used to accurately determine the heritage and origin of a blade. As such, they can be considered a more trustworthy signature of a smith than the actual signature itself.

A good polishing reveals what speed the edge was cooled at, from what temperature, and what the carbon content of the steel is. It does this by displaying either predominantly nioi (匂), which is a mix of extremely fine martensite with troostite (another type of tempered steel), or the larger martensite crystals called nie (錵), which look like individual dot-like mirrors.
