= Bushi (music) =

Genre of Japanese folk music

Bushi (節) is a type of Japanese folk music genre.

The Japanese term fushi (節), originally used in Buddhist folk music in Japan, simply means "melody". Like the generic term ondo, bushi, the voiced form of fushi, is used as a suffix for Japanese folk songs.

It is found in many Japanese traditional and folk songs, usually shamisen or sanshin songs. Some examples include: Ringo bushi, Tsugaru yosare bushi, Tsugaru aiya bushi, Tsugaru jongara bushi, Yasaburō bushi (弥三郎節), Hōnen bushi and Itokuri bushi. Yasaburō bushi is one of the best known, and dates back over 300 years. These folk songs are most commonly heard at local festivals in Japan.

== See also ==
- Tsugaru-jamisen
- Shamisen
- Ryukyuan music
