= Intangible cultural heritage =

Type of cultural heritage

Intangible cultural heritage (ICH)—as opposed to a place's tangible cultural heritage, cultural properties such as historic sites, monuments, and artifacts—comprises manifestations of intellectual wealth such as customs, beliefs, traditions, folklore, language, and knowledge, as expressed in particular through craftsmanship and performance.

Responding to the perceived over-representation of Western Europe among World Heritage Sites, to help valorize cultural diversity, and following on from earlier related measures in Japan (1950) and in South Korea (1962), in 2001, UNESCO made a survey among states and NGOs to try to agree on a definition, and the Convention for the Safeguarding of the Intangible Cultural Heritage was drafted in 2003 for its protection and promotion.

== Definition ==
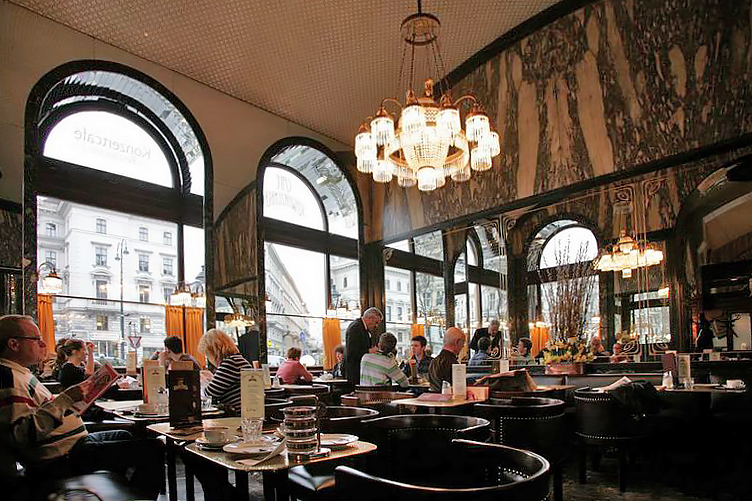
The Viennese coffee house culture, a special form of cultural heritage

The Convention for the Safeguarding of the Intangible Cultural Heritage defines intangible cultural heritage as the practices, representations, expressions, as well as the knowledge and skills (including instruments, objects, artifacts, cultural spaces), that communities, groups, and, in some cases, individuals, recognize as part of their cultural heritage. It is sometimes called living cultural heritage, and is manifested in the following domains, among others:

- Oral traditions and expressions, including language as a vehicle of the intangible cultural heritage;
- Performing arts;
- Social practices, rituals and festive events;
- Knowledge and practices concerning nature and the universe;
- Traditional craftsmanship

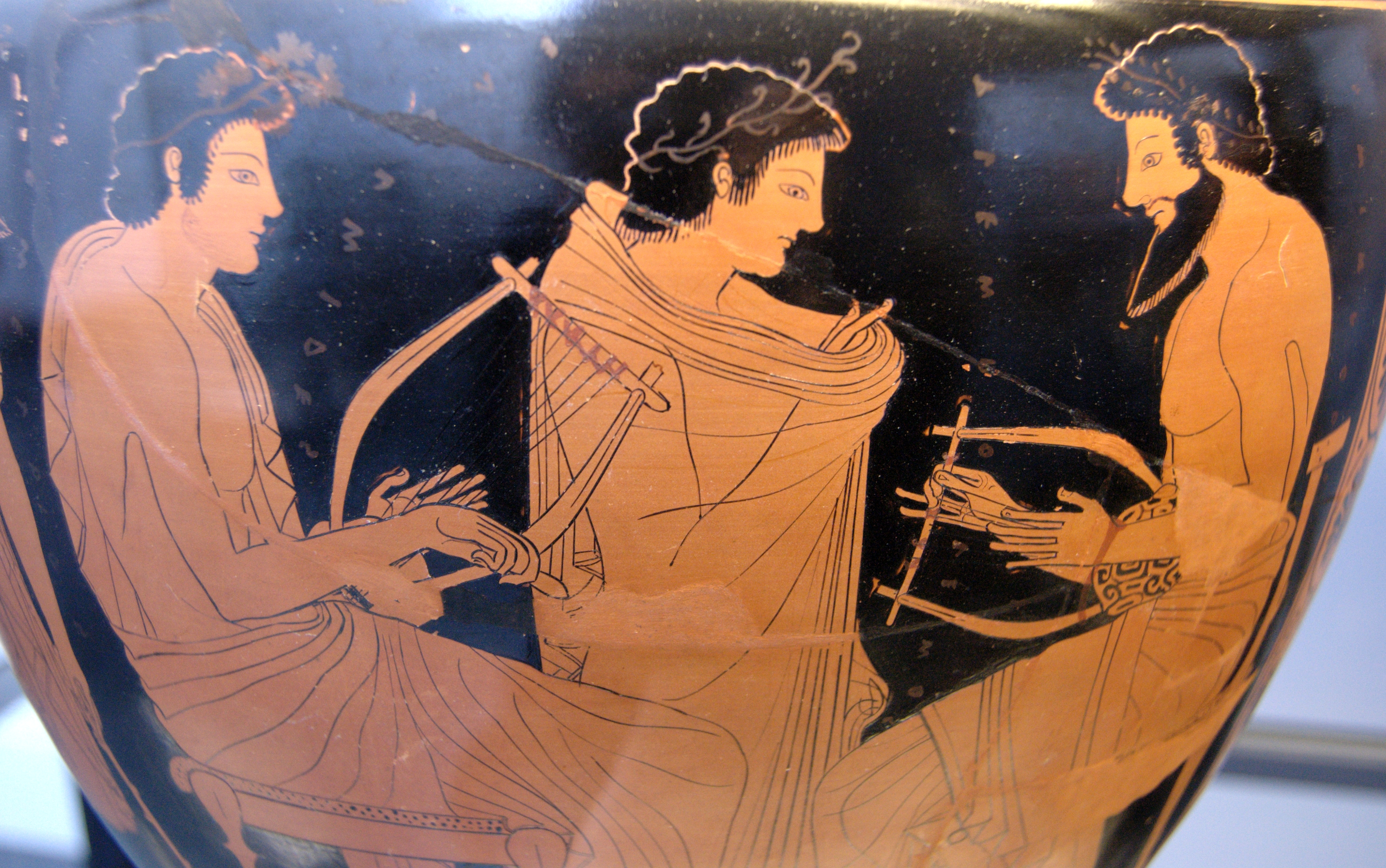
A painting on an ancient Greek vase depicts a music lesson (c. 510 BC)

Cultural heritage in general consists of the products and processes of a culture that are preserved and passed on through the generations. Some of that heritage takes the form of cultural property, formed by tangible artefacts such as buildings or works of art. Many parts of culture, however, are intangible, including song, music, dance, drama, skills, cuisine, sport, crafts, and festivals. These are forms of culture that can be recorded but cannot be touched or stored in physical form, like in a museum, but only experienced through a vehicle giving expression to it. Such cultural vehicles are called "Human Treasures" by the UN. The protection of languages, as the largest and most important intangible cultural heritage, should also be mentioned in this context. According to Karl von Habsburg, former President of Blue Shield International, protection of languages is important in the age of identity wars, because language in particular can become a target for attack as a symbolic cultural asset.

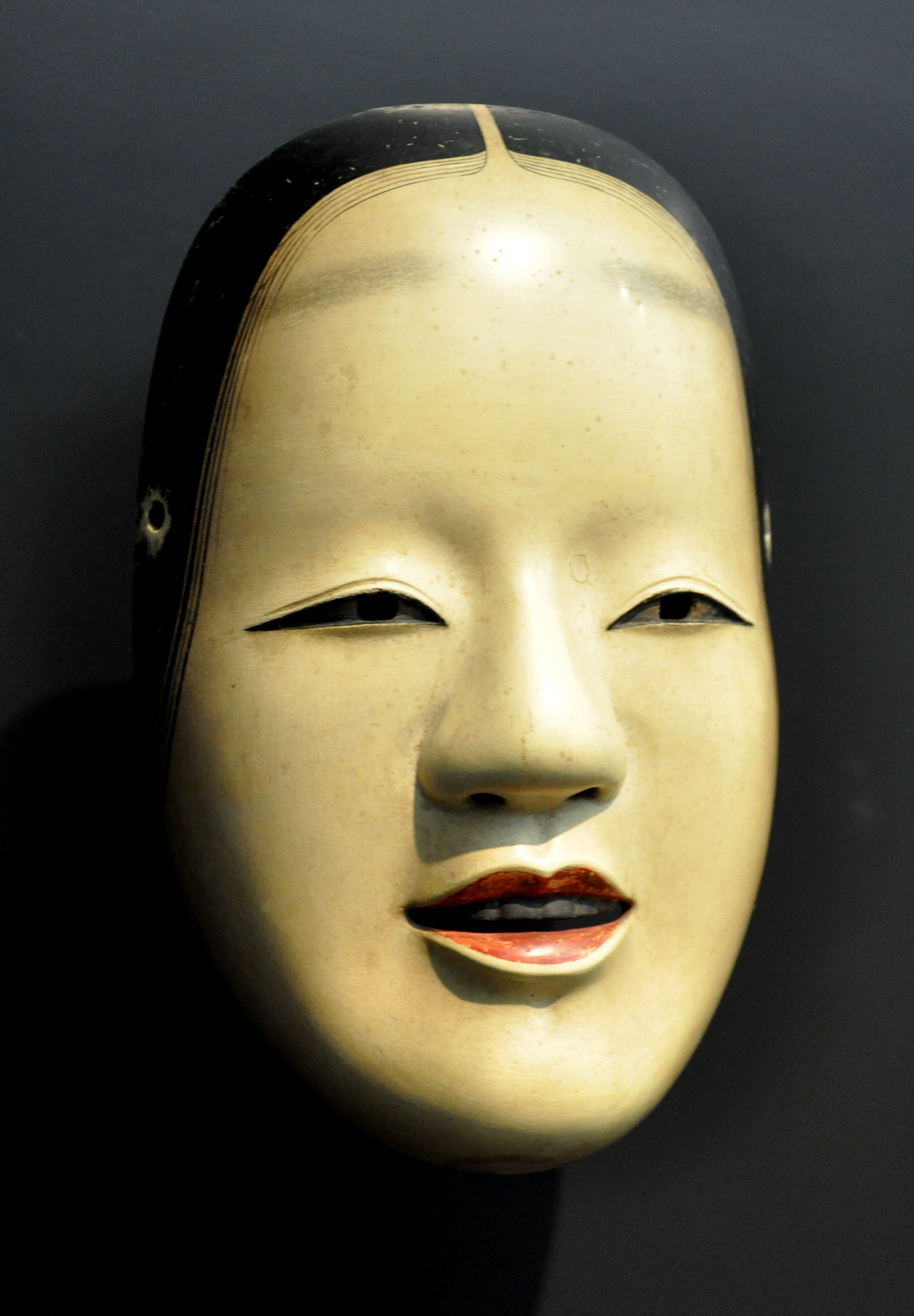
Noh mask. Japan was the first country to introduce legislation to protect and promote its intangible heritage.

According to the 2003 Convention for the Safeguarding of the Intangible Cultural Heritage, the intangible cultural heritage (ICH) – or living heritage – is the mainspring of humanity's cultural diversity and its maintenance a guarantee for continuing creativity. It is defined as follows:

Intangible Cultural Heritage means the practices, representations, expressions, knowledge, skills – as well as the instruments, objects, artifacts and cultural spaces associated therewith – that communities, groups and, in some cases, individuals recognize as part of their cultural heritage. This intangible cultural heritage, transmitted from generation to generation, is constantly recreated by communities and groups in response to their environment, their interaction with nature and their history, and provides them with a sense of identity and continuity, thus promoting respect for cultural diversity and human creativity. For the purposes of this Convention, consideration will be given solely to such intangible cultural heritage as is compatible with existing international human rights instruments, as well as with the requirements of mutual respect among communities, groups and individuals, and of sustainable development.

=== Oral history ===
Intangible cultural heritage is slightly different from the discipline of oral history, the recording, preservation and interpretation of historical information (specifically, oral tradition), based on the personal experiences and opinions of the speaker. ICH attempts to preserve cultural heritage 'with' the people or community by protecting the processes that allow traditions and shared knowledge to be passed on while oral history seeks to collect and preserve historical information obtained from individuals and groups.

=== Food heritage ===
With sustainable development gaining momentum as a priority of UNESCO heritage policies, an increasing number of food-related nominations are being submitted for inscription on the lists of the convention for the safeguarding of the intangible cultural heritage. The Mediterranean diet, the traditional Mexican cuisine and the Japanese dietary culture of washoku are some examples of this.

==== Traditional dishes ====
- Thieboudienne
- Tom yum kung

=== Dance heritage ===
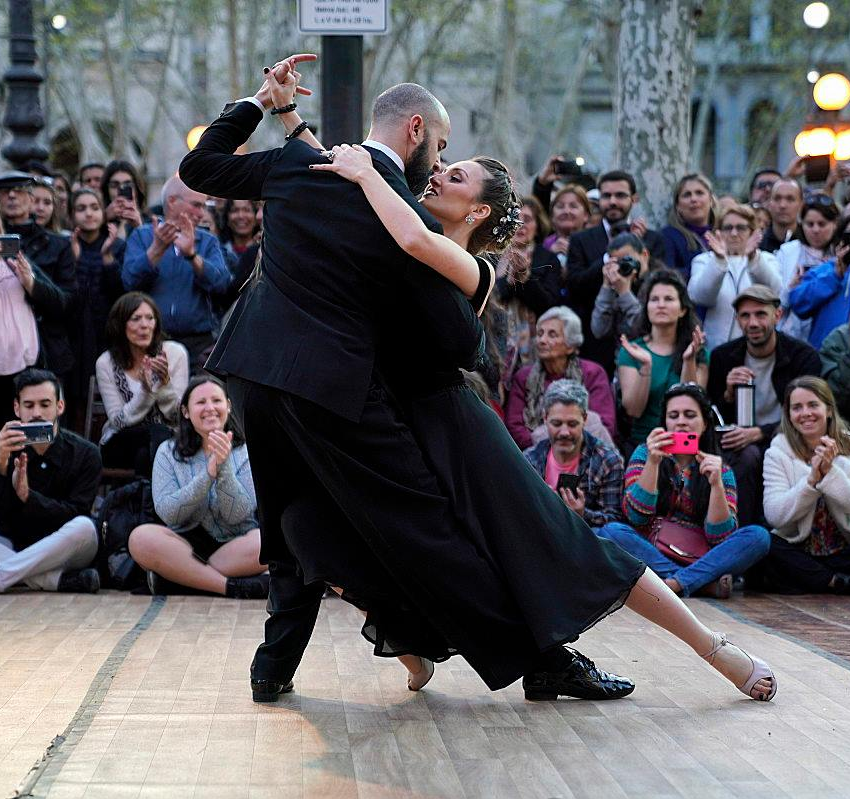
Tango, an example of a cultural heritage shared between two countries, Argentina and Uruguay

The UNESCO lists of intangible cultural heritage also include a variety of dance genres, often associated with singing, music and celebrations, from all over the world. The lists include: celebratory and ritual dances such as Ma'di bowl lyre music and Sebiba dance from Algeria and dance from Uganda and Kalbelia folk songs and dances of Rajasthan from India, and social dances such as Cuban rumba. Also, some dances are localized and practiced mainly in their country of origin, such as Sankirtana, a performing art that includes drumming and singing, from India.

Other dance forms, however, even if they are officially recognized as heritage from their country of origin, are practiced and enjoyed all over the world. For example, flamenco from Spain and tango, from Argentina and Uruguay, have an international dimension. Dance is a complex phenomenon, which involves culture, traditions, the use of human bodies, artefacts (such as costumes and props), as well as a specific use of music, space and sometimes light. As a result, a lot of tangible and intangible elements are combined within dance, making it a challenging but interesting type of heritage to safeguard.

=== Digital heritage ===
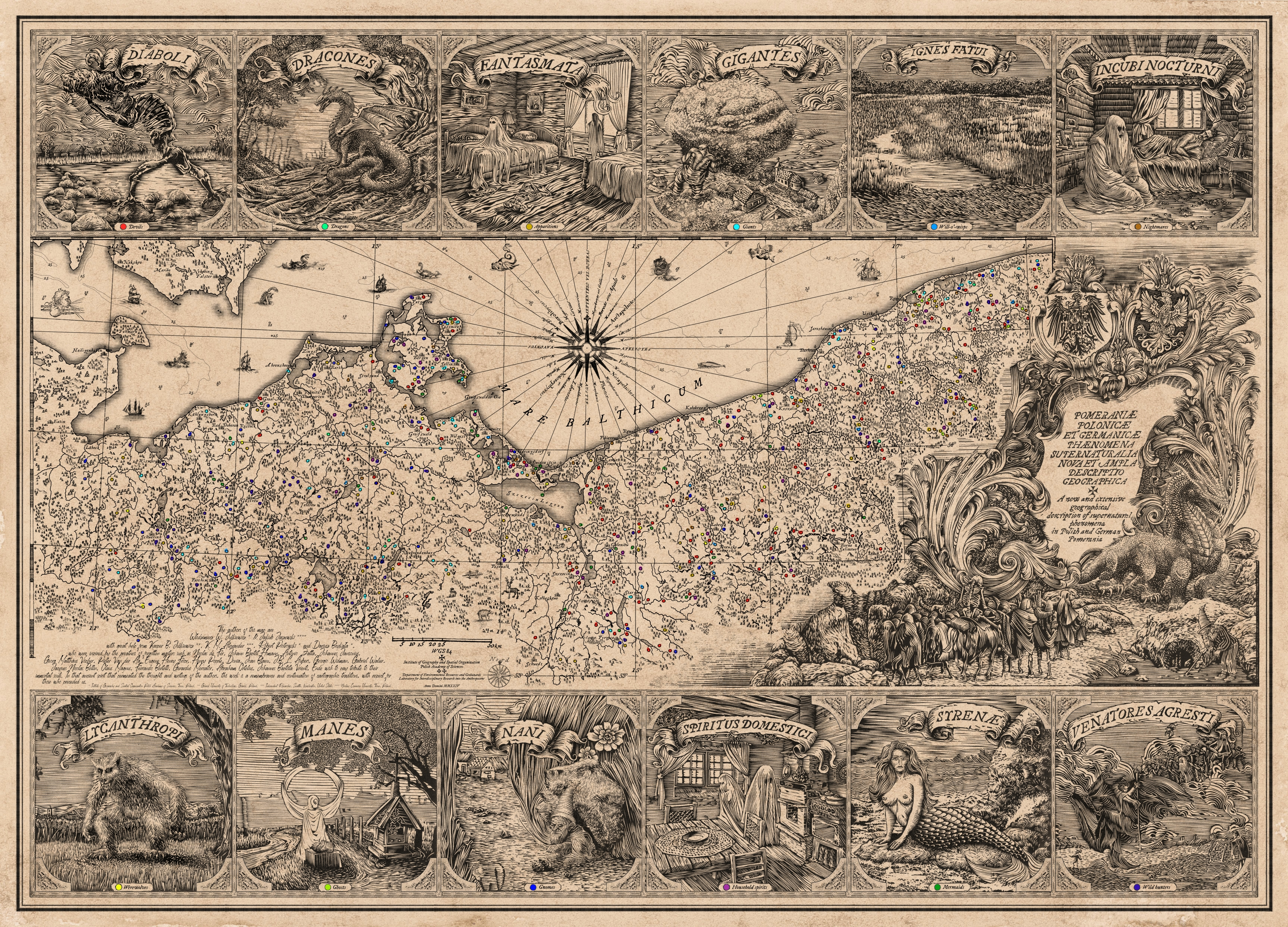
Mapping of intangible heritage phenomena (GIS technology)

Digital heritage is a representation of heritage in the digital realm and is a sub-category of Intangible Cultural Heritage. It refers primarily to the use of digital media in the service of preserving cultural or natural heritage. Examples of this include mapping of intangible heritage phenomena, such as folk beliefs linked to the supernatural beings.

=== Sports heritage ===
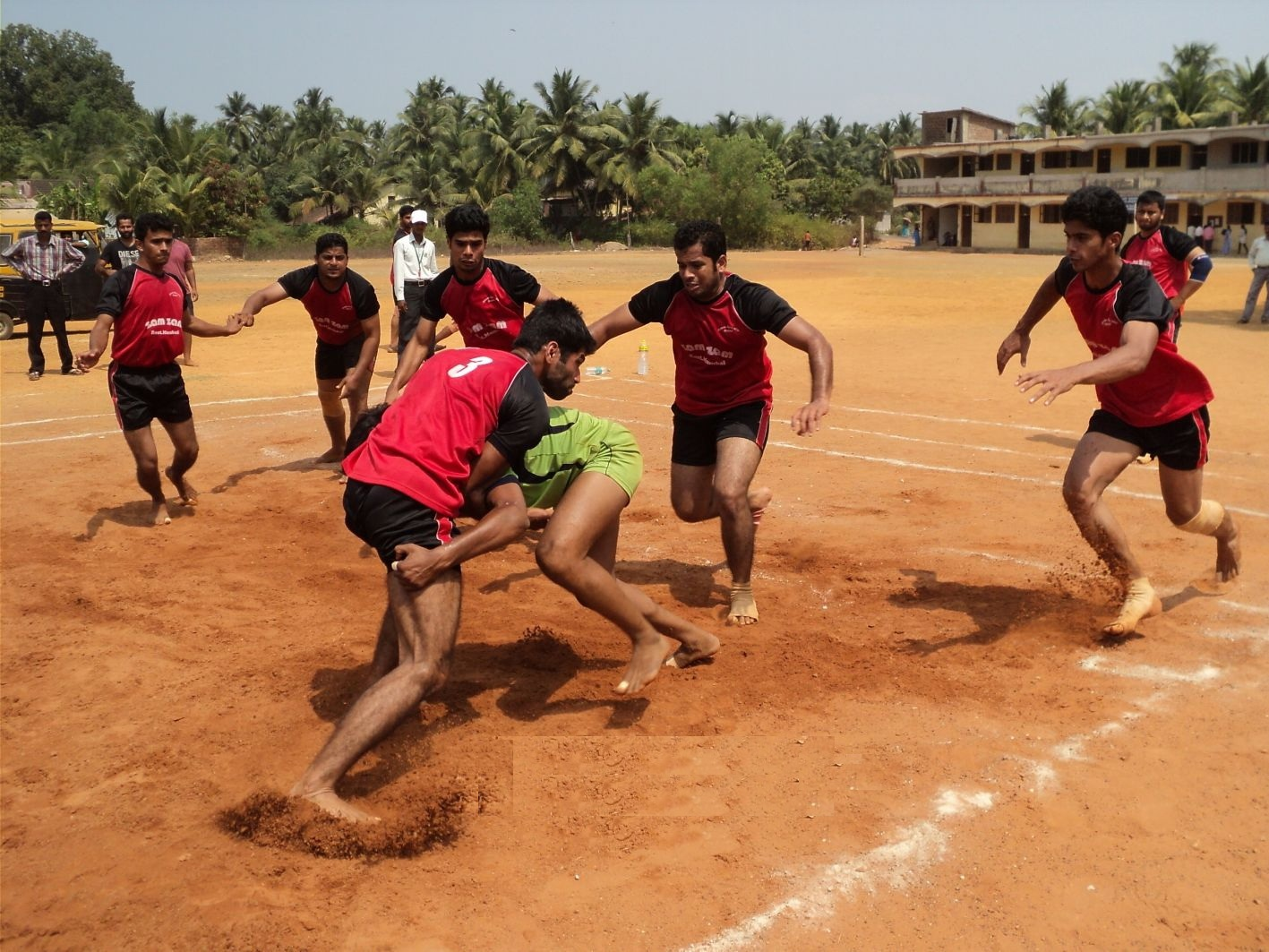
Kabaddi, a traditional Indian game which has become increasingly popular around the world

UNESCO promotes TSG as a form of "intangible cultural heritage", and had a dedicated TSG Advisory Committee. Four Collective Consultation Meetings: 2006 in Paris, 2009 in Teheran, 2017 in Paris have been held so far by UNESCO, with the fourth one in 2018 in Istanbul gathering more than 82 participants from 40 countries.

== Oral continuity ==
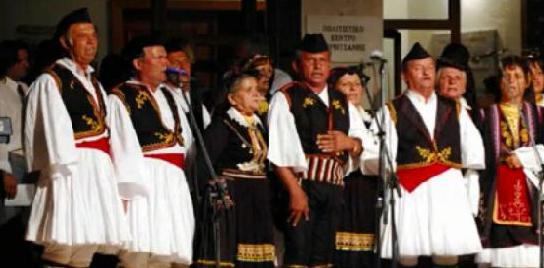
Greek polyphonic group from Dropull wearing skoufos and fustanella

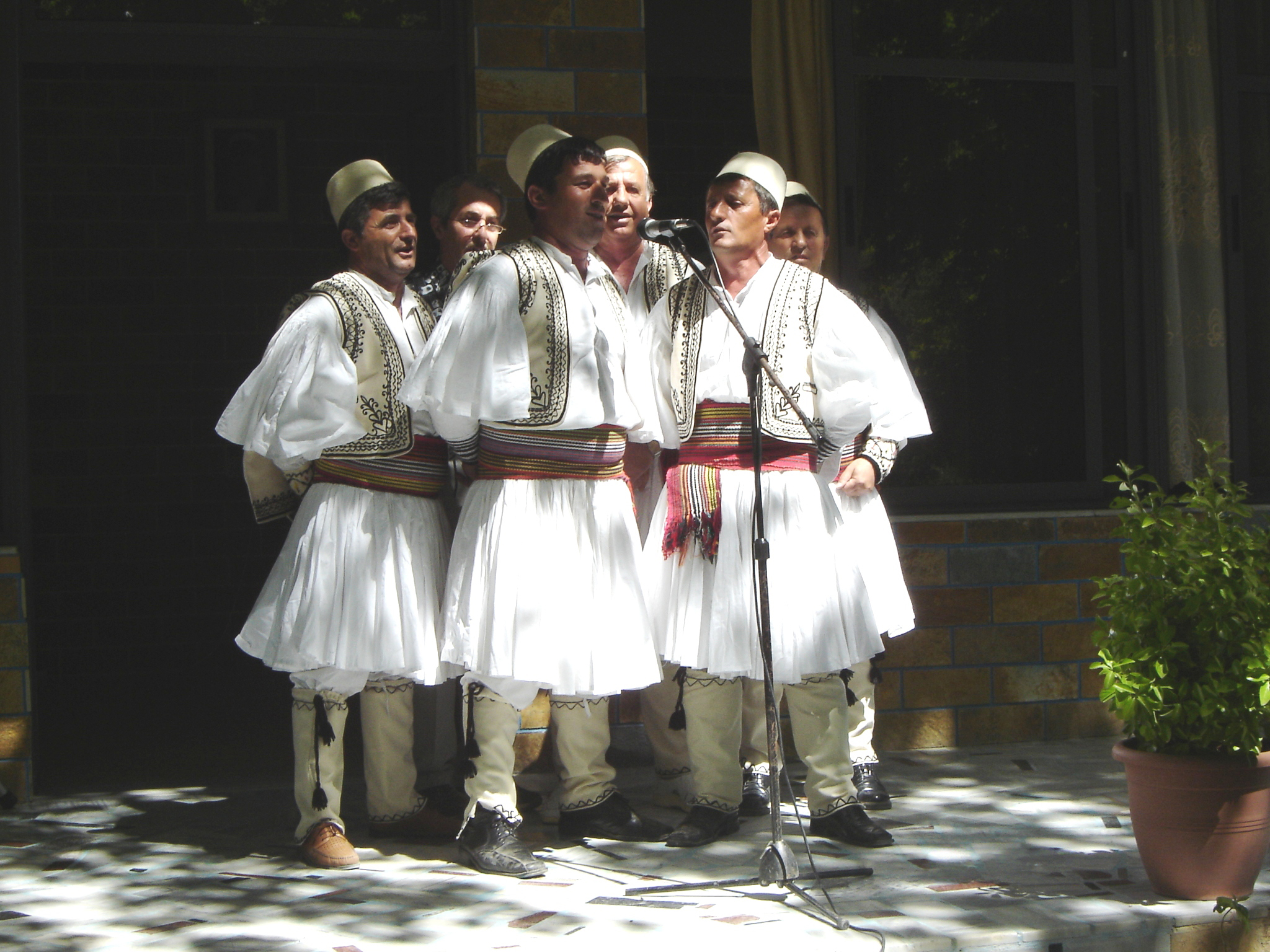
Albanian polyphonic group from Skrapar wearing qeleshe and fustanella

Intangible cultural heritage is passed orally within a community, and while there may be individuals who are known tradition bearers, ICH is often broader than one individual's own skills or knowledge. A 2006 report by the government of Newfoundland and Labrador said, regarding oral culture in their area, "The processes involved in the continuation of this traditional knowledge constitute one of the most interesting aspects of our living heritage. Each member of the community possesses a piece of the shared knowledge. Crucial knowledge is passed on during community activities, frequently without any conscious attention to the process."

== Preservation ==
Prior to the UNESCO Convention, efforts had already been made by a number of states to safeguard their intangible heritage. Japan, with its 1950 Law for the Protection of Cultural Properties, was the first to introduce legislation to preserve and promote intangible as well as tangible culture: Important Intangible Cultural Properties are designated and "holders" recognized of these craft and performance traditions, known informally as Living National Treasures. Other countries, including South Korea (Important Intangible Cultural Properties of Korea), the Philippines, Ukraine, the United States, Thailand, France, Romania, the Czech Republic, and Poland, have since created similar programs.

In 2003 UNESCO adopted the Convention for the Safeguarding of the Intangible Cultural Heritage. This went into effect on 20 April 2006. The Convention recommends that countries and scholars develop inventories of ICH in their territory, as well as work with the groups who maintain these ICH to ensure their continued existences; it also provides for funds to be voluntarily collected among UNESCO members and then disbursed to support the maintenance of recognized ICH. UNESCO has also created other intangible culture programs, such as a list called Proclamation of Masterpieces of the Oral and Intangible Heritage of Humanity. This list began in 2001 with 19 items and a further 28 were listed in 2003 and another 43 in 2005. In part, the original list was seen as a way to correct the imbalance in the World Heritage List, since it excluded many Southern Hemisphere cultures which did not produce monuments or other physical cultural manifestations. It was superseded in 2008 by the UNESCO Intangible Cultural Heritage Lists.

According to academic Yi Sun publishing in 2024, "China has played an increasingly dynamic role in energizing" the Intangible Cultural Heritage Cooperation program.

Recently there has been much debate over protecting intangible cultural heritage through intellectual property rights, as well as the desirability to do so through this legal framework and the risks of commodification derived from this possibility.

In recent years, digital methods have increasingly been used to support the documentation and preservation of Intangible Cultural Heritage. Approaches developed within the field of Digital Humanities—including digital mapping, data visualization, and network analysis—enable researchers to document cultural practices, trace the circulation of traditional knowledge, and analyze the transformation of heritage in digital environments. Such methods have also been applied to study processes of appropriation or biopiracy of traditional medicinal knowledge through the analysis of web data and patent databases, contributing to new forms of digital monitoring and documentation of intangible cultural heritage.

== List of countries with UNESCO Intangible Cultural Heritage elements ==
Note: Each country may maintain its own cultural heritage lists, items of which are not necessarily inscribed into UNESCO lists.

Rank	Country	ICHs (Note: Number of intangible cultural heritage elements inscribed by UNESCO)	Ref
1	China	45	
2	Turkey	32	
3	France	30	
4	Iran	27	
5	Spain	26	
6	Azerbaijan	24	
7	Croatia	23	
7	Japan	23	
7	South Korea	23	
8	Belgium	21	
8	Italy	21	
8	United Arab Emirates	21	
9	Oman	18	
9	Saudi Arabia	18	
9	Uzbekistan	18	
10	Mongolia	17	
10	Vietnam	17	
11	India	16	
11	Indonesia	16	
11	Kyrgyzstan	16	
11	Morocco	16	
12	Colombia	15	
12	Peru	15	
13	Iraq	14	
13	Kazakhstan	14	
14	Algeria	13	
14	Mexico	13	
14	Tajikistan	13	
15	Austria	12	
15	Portugal	12	
16	Greece	11	
16	Czech Republic	11	
16	Egypt	11	
16	Jordan	11	
16	Romania	11	
16	Switzerland	11	
16	Venezuela	11	
17	Bolivia	10	
17	Brazil	10	
17	Germany	10	
17	Hungary	10	
17	Slovakia	10	
17	Tunisia	10	
17	Turkmenistan	10	
18	Bulgaria	9	
18	Malaysia	9	
18	Mali	9	
18	Mauritania	9	
18	Palestine	9	
18	Syria	9	
19	Armenia	8	
19	Cuba	8	
19	Cyprus	8	
19	Nigeria	8	
20	Belarus	7	
20	Cambodia	7	
20	Estonia	7	
20	Ethiopia	7	
20	Kuwait	7	
20	Philippines	7	
20	Poland	7	
20	Qatar	7	
20	Slovenia	7	
20	Ukraine	7	
21	Bangladesh	6	
21	Bosnia and Herzegovina	6	
21	Kenya	6	
21	Luxembourg	6	
21	Malawi	6	
21	North Macedonia	6	
21	Norway	6	
21	Serbia	6	
21	Sudan	6	
21	Thailand	6	
21	Uganda	6	
21	Yemen	6	
21	Zambia	6	
22	Afghanistan	5	
22	Albania	5	
22	Bahrain	5	
22	Dominican Republic	5	
22	Georgia	5	
22	Guatemala	5	
22	Ireland	5	
22	Ivory Coast	5	
22	Moldova	5	
22	Netherlands	5	
22	North Korea	5	
22	Panama	5	
23	Andorra	4	
23	Argentina	4	
23	Botswana	4	
23	Cameroon	4	
23	Chile	4	
23	Ecuador	4	
23	Finland	4	
23	Lithuania	4	
23	Madagascar	4	
23	Mauritius	4	
23	Pakistan	4	
23	Paraguay	4	
23	Sweden	4	
24	Djibouti	3	
24	Haiti	3	
24	Jamaica	3	
24	Latvia	3	
24	Lebanon	3	
24	Mozambique	3	
24	Senegal	3	
24	Sri Lanka	3	
24	Togo	3	
27	Belize	2	
27	Denmark	2	
27	Honduras	2	
27	Iceland	2	
27	Ghana	2	
27	Republic of the Congo	2	
27	Namibia	2	
27	Nicaragua	2	
27	Niger	2	
27	Russia	2	
27	Somalia	2	
27	Uruguay	2	
27	Zimbabwe	2	
26	Angola	1	
26	Bahamas	1	
26	Bhutan	1	
26	Burkina Faso	1	
26	Burundi	1	
26	Central African Republic	1	
26	Chad	1	
26	Comoros	1	
26	Democratic Republic of the Congo	1	
26	El Salvador	1	
26	Gabon	1	
26	Gambia	1	
26	Guinea	1	
26	Libya	1	
26	Myanmar	1	
26	Rwanda	1	
26	Vanuatu	1	

== See also ==
- Living human treasure
- Non-material culture
