= Oku-noto no Aenokoto =

Farming ritual in Ishikawa Prefecture, Japan

Oku-noto no Aenokoto 奥能登のあえのこと
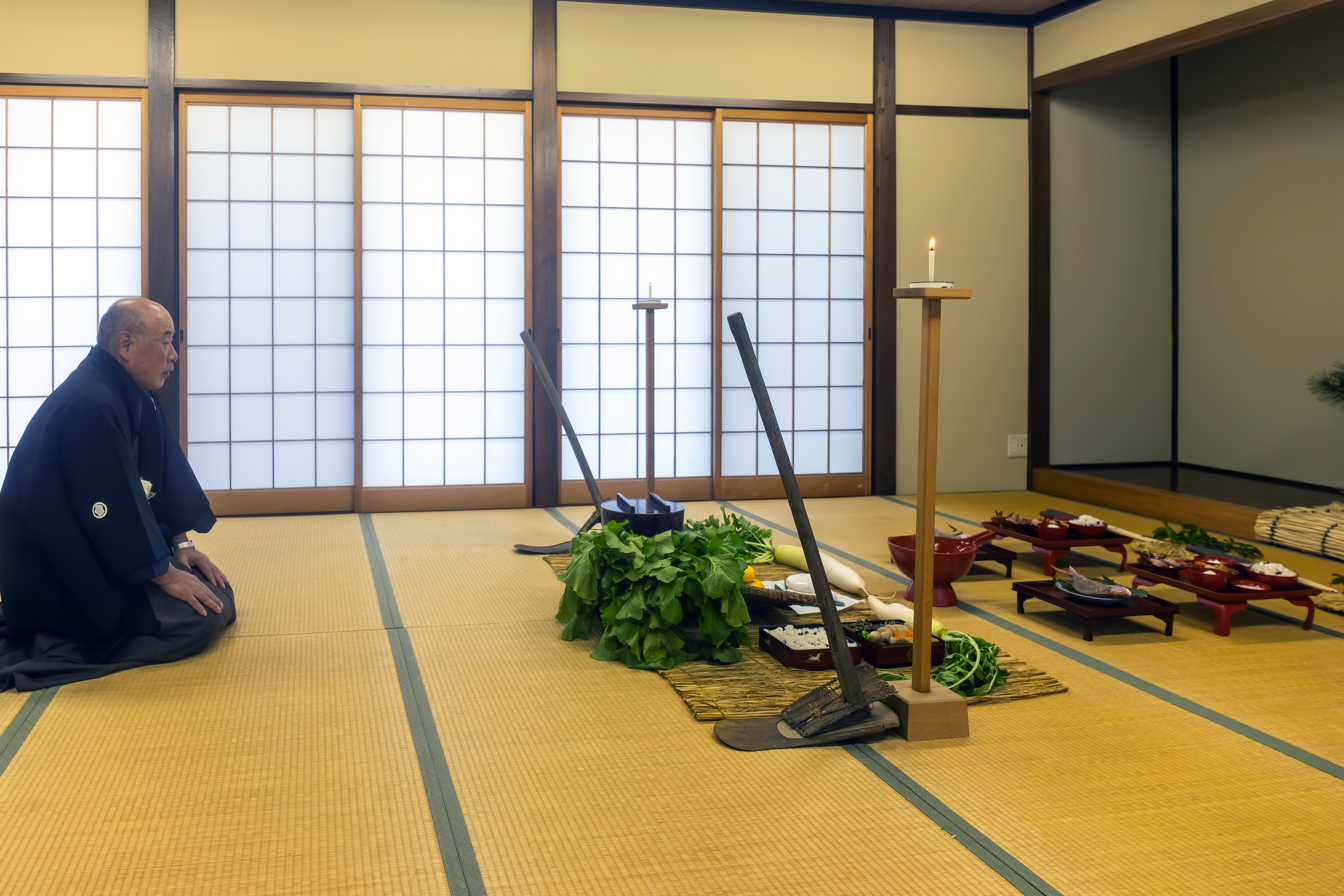
- Date: December
- Frequency: Annually
- Location: Noto Peninsula
- Country: Japan

Oku-noto no Aenokoto
- UNESCO Intangible Cultural Heritage
- Country: Japan
- Reference: 00271
- Region: Asia and the Pacific

Inscription history
- Inscription: 2009 (4th session)
- List: Representative list

Oku-noto no Aenokoto (奥能登のあえのこと) is a ritual passed down from generation to generation by farmers in the Noto Peninsula, in Ishikawa Prefecture, Japan. Ae is an old Japanese word for a banquet; therefore, Aenokoto essentially means "banquet ritual."

This ceremony is unique among harvesting rituals in Asia, because the master of the house invites the god of the paddy field to come inside the house. People behave as if the invisible spirit is present in the house. The guest kami is believed to be an ancestor of the family.

In December, the farmer prepares a meal and summons the spirit of the paddy field by the sound of pounding rice cakes (mochi). In ceremonial dress, he welcomes his guest with a lantern. The farmer lets the spirit rest in a room, prepares a bath for it, and offers a meal of rice, beans and fish. The mind has poor eyesight and therefore the host must describe the meal well while serving it. A similar ritual takes place for the February sowing. There are several variations of this ceremony.

UNESCO inscribed the ritual in 2009 on the Representative List of the Intangible Cultural Heritage of Humanity.
