= Seigo Kosaku =

The seigo kosaku (國民政府の清鄉工作) program of pacification was the Japanese security plan to maintain peace and order in occupied territories in China during wartime. Similar policies were implemented also in Manchukuo and Mengjiang, as well as by the Chinese Reformed Government. It was put into practice in occupied territories in Sichuan province when the Chiang Kai-shek regime was defeated and a pro-Japanese native government was installed.
