= Hayachine kagura =

Hayachine kagura 早池峰神楽
- Genre: Kagura
- Date: 1 August
- Frequency: Annual
- Venue: Hayachine Shrine
- Locations: Hanamaki, Japan

Hayachine Kagura
- UNESCO Intangible Cultural Heritage
- Country: Japan
- Reference: 00272
- Region: Asia and the Pacific

Inscription history
- Inscription: 2009 (4th session)
- List: Representative

Hayachine kagura (早池峰神楽) is a ritual dance, or kagura, in Shinto ceremonies, which is composed of a series of twelve dances. It is performed on August 1 at Hayachine Shrine in Hanamaki, Iwate, Japan.

These dances are performed in honor of Seoritsu, tutelary deity of Mount Hayachine, to music of containing drums, cymbals and flutes. The first six dances (Torimai Bird Dance 鳥 舞, Okina Old Man Dance 翁, Sanbasō Third Old Man Dance 三 番 叟, War God Hachiman Dance 八 幡, Mountain God Yama no kami 山 の 神 Dance, Opening Dance of the rock cave Iwato biraki 岩 戸) are ritualistic, the next five tell the medieval history of Japan and its deities (there are many different hypotheses on the constitution of the cycle of 12 dances). The dancers are masked. The final dance is performed by a shishi, a personification of the mountain god.

The dances are also performed at other times of the year and outside of the Hayachine Shrine, but rarely in the full cycle, which lasts five hours. Hayachine kagura "discipleship" shows are performed throughout Iwate Prefecture.

== History ==
The tradition dates back to the 14th or 15th century and would have been influenced by the practices of the yamabushi, Buddhist ascetics withdrawn in the mountains; moreover, scholars wonder about its relation with the history of the noh theater.

UNESCO inscribed Hayachine Kagura on the Representative List of the Intangible Cultural Heritage of Humanity in 2009.
