= Saga Nishiki =

Brocading with Japanese paper

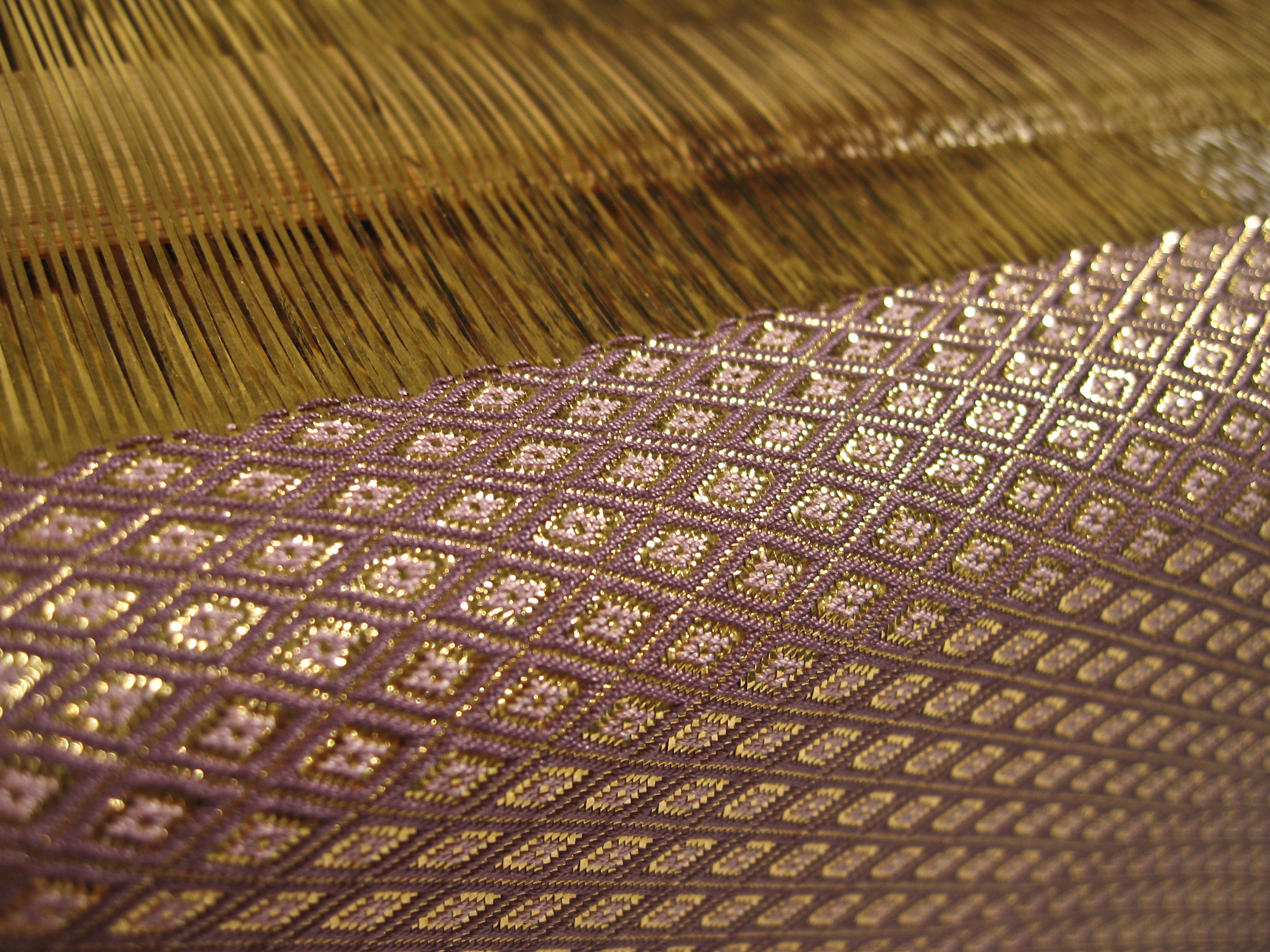
A Saga Nishiki work

Saga Nishiki (佐賀錦, Saga-nishiki) is a form of brocading from Saga Prefecture, Japan. It is a unique form of brocading in that Japanese paper is used as the warp. This paper is coated in metal leaf either gold, silver or lacquer. The weft is a silk thread which is dyed. As the technique is time-consuming, only several inches are produced each day.

== History ==
Saga Nishiki was created at the end of the Edo period by Kashima Nabeshima, the daimyō of Saga. At this time it was referred to as Kashima Nishiki. It was not until the Japan–British Exhibition of 1910 that it was renamed "Saga Nishiki".

== Gallery ==
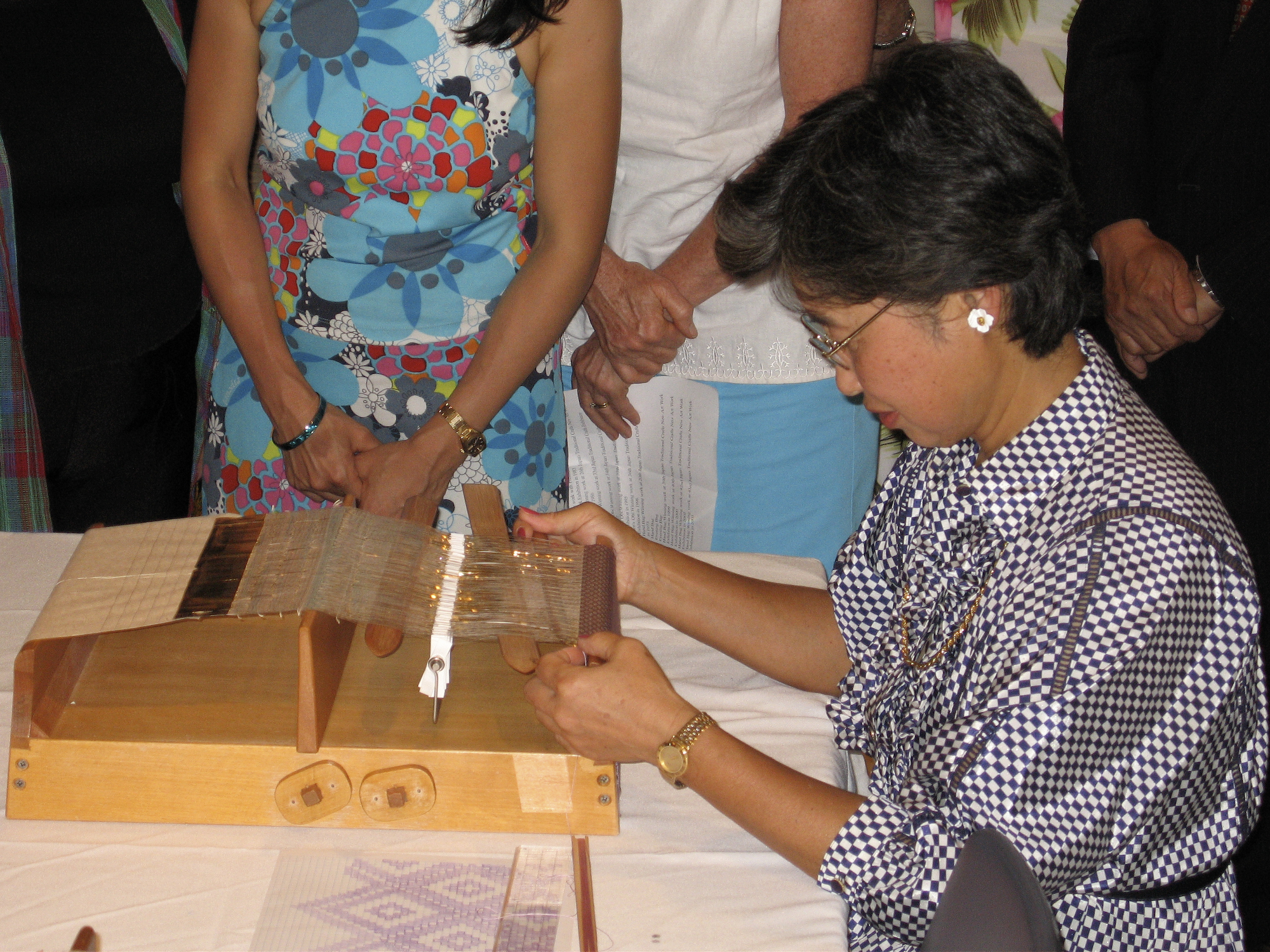
A woman brocades

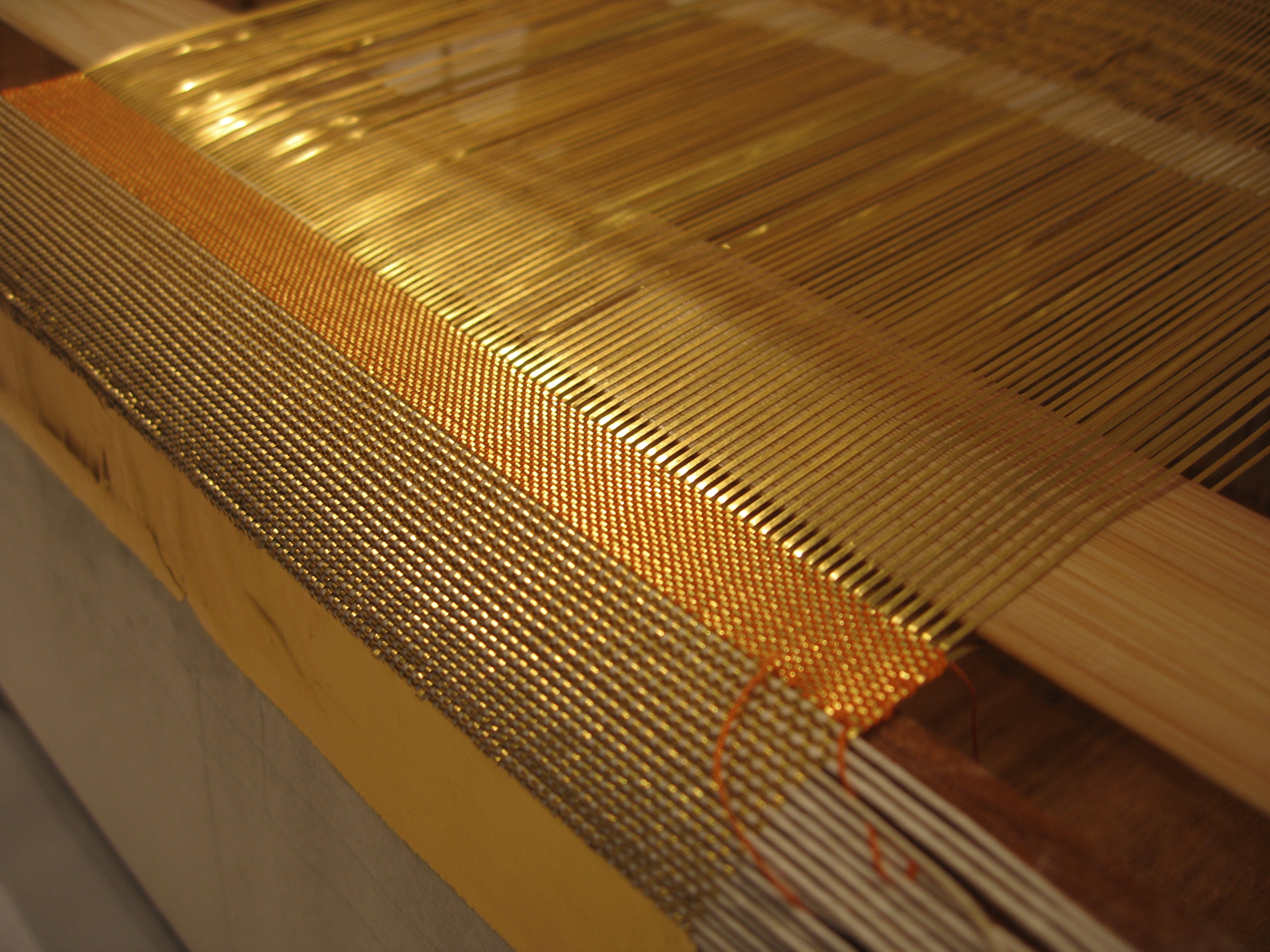
A Saga nishiki fabric

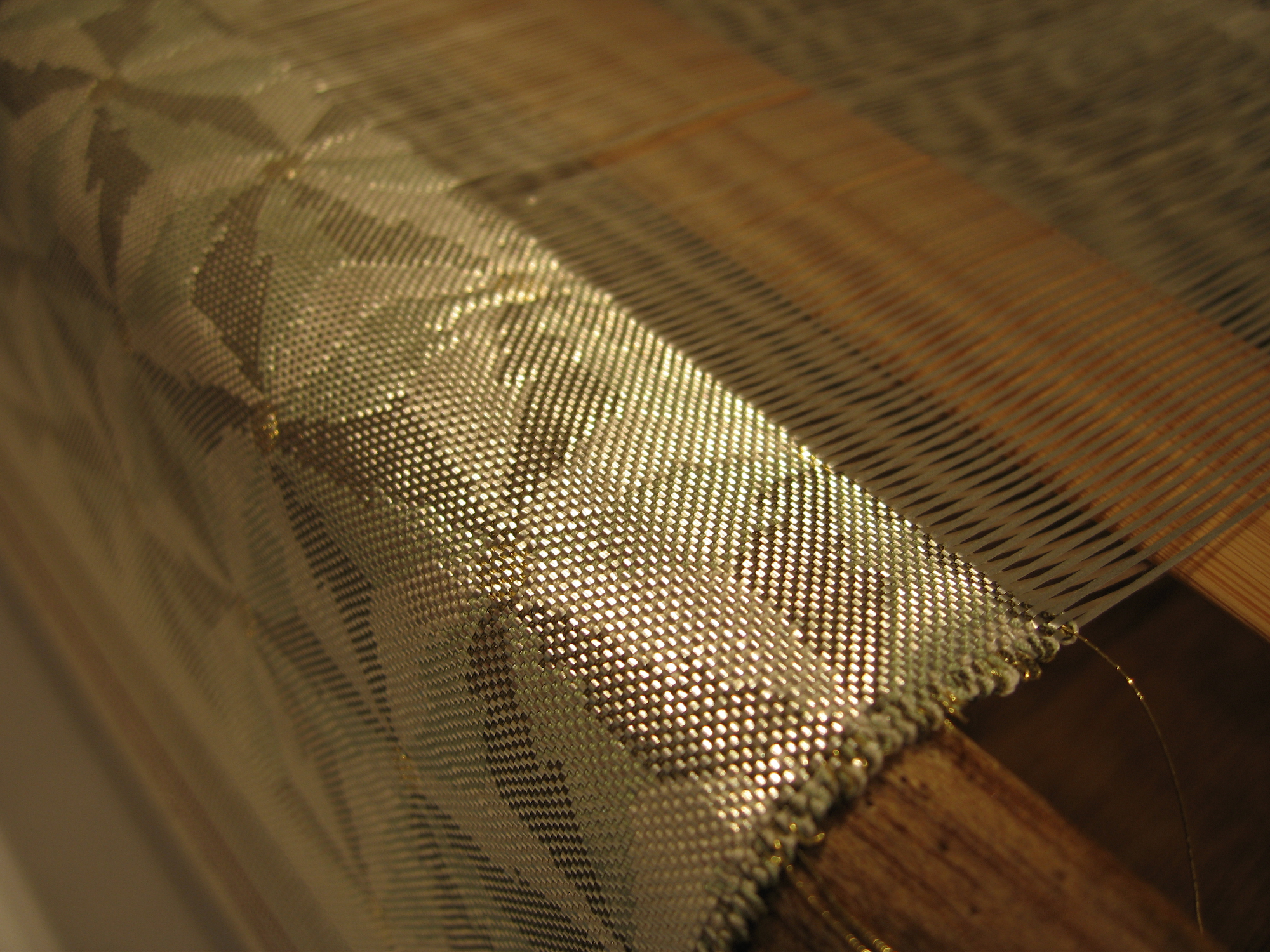
A Saga nishiki fabric

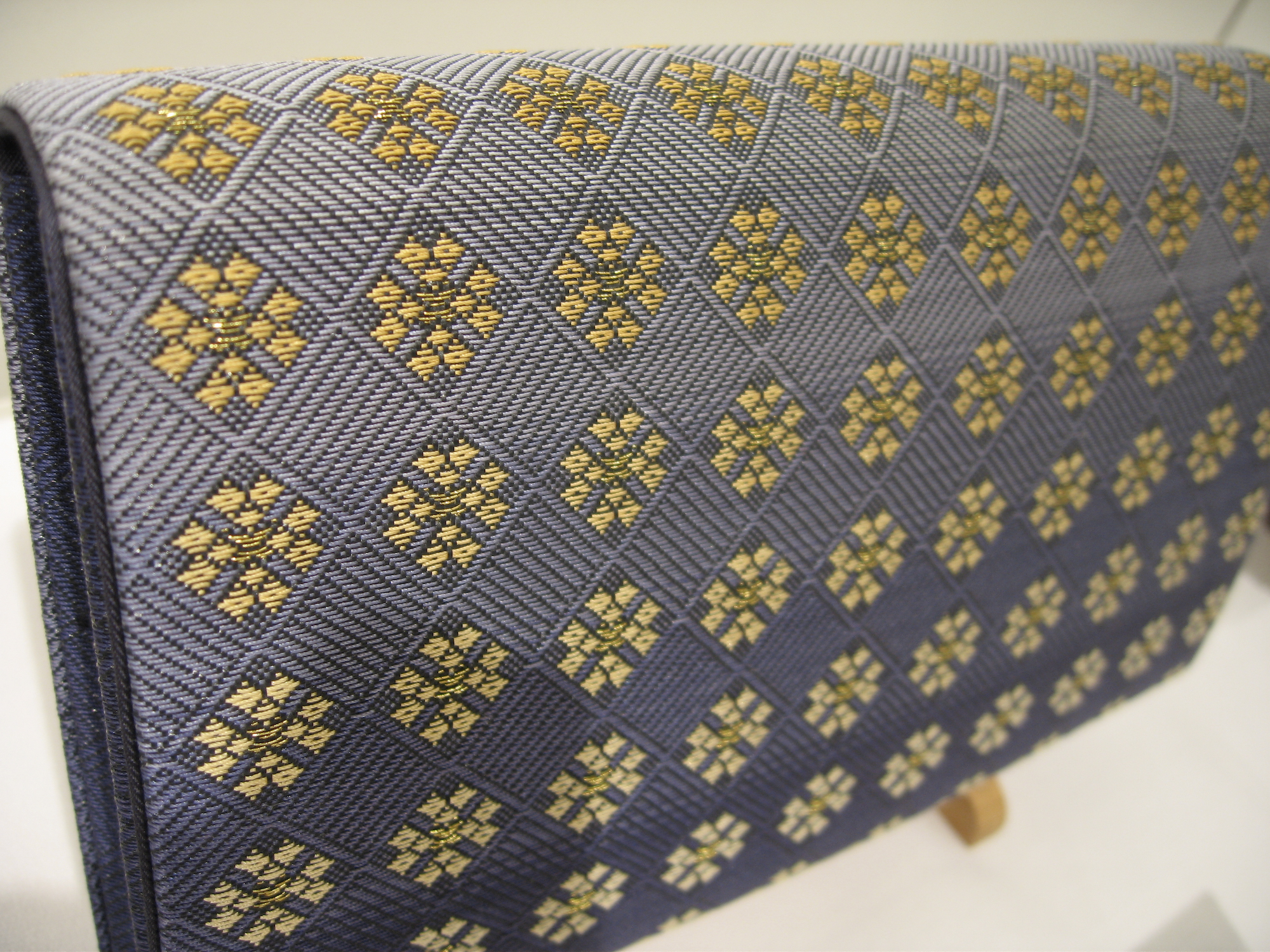
A handbag

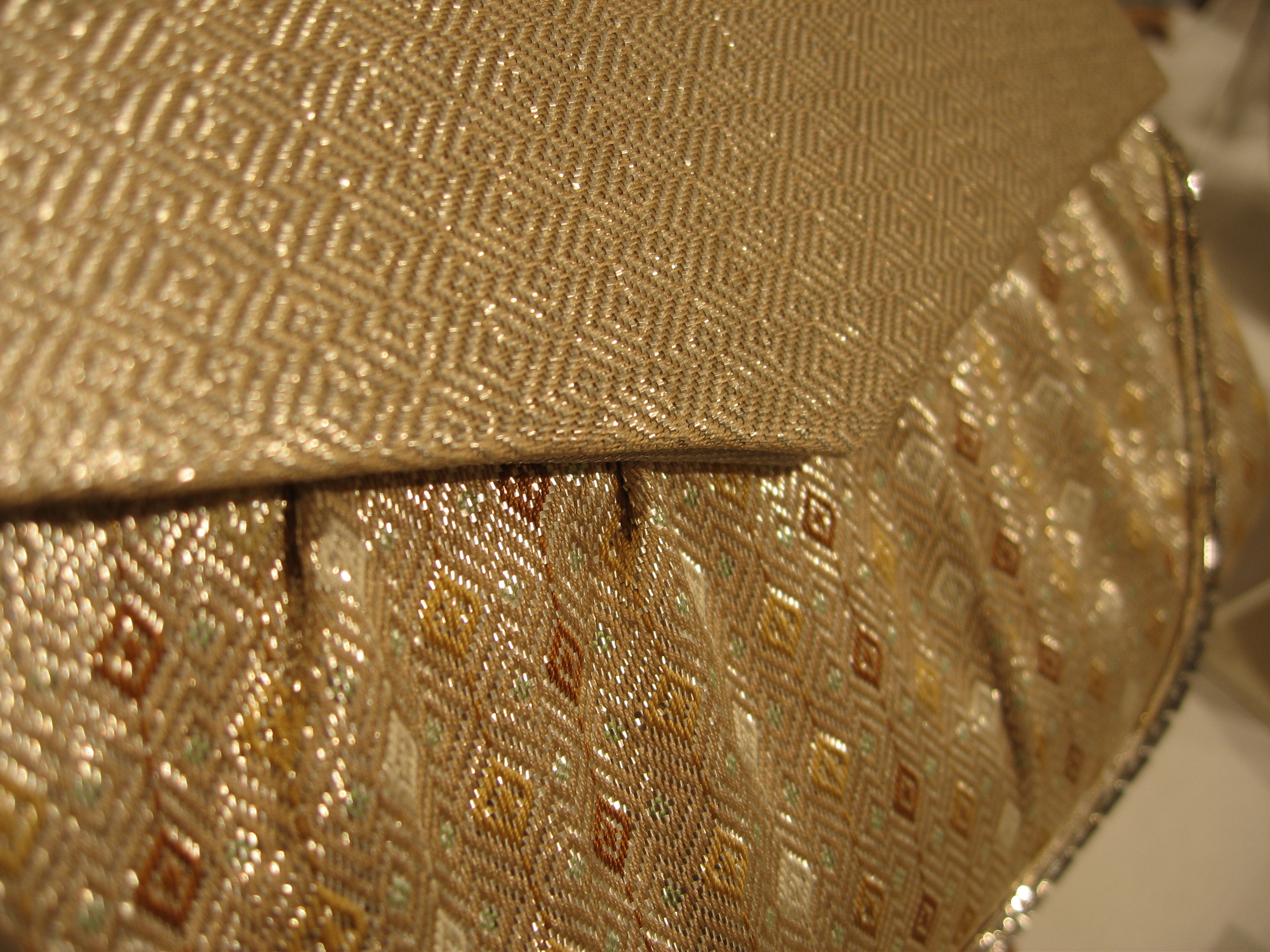
A handbag

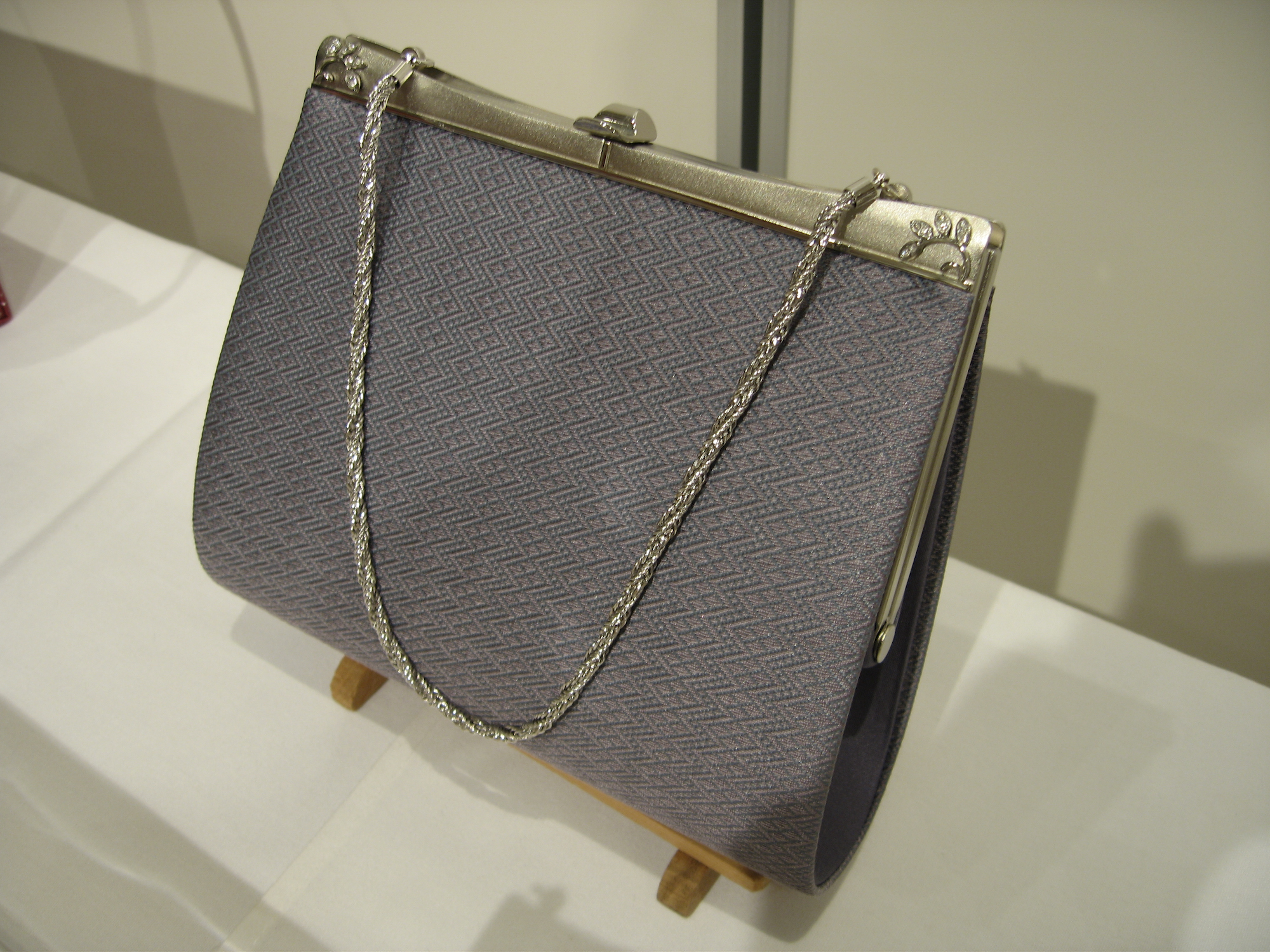
A handbag

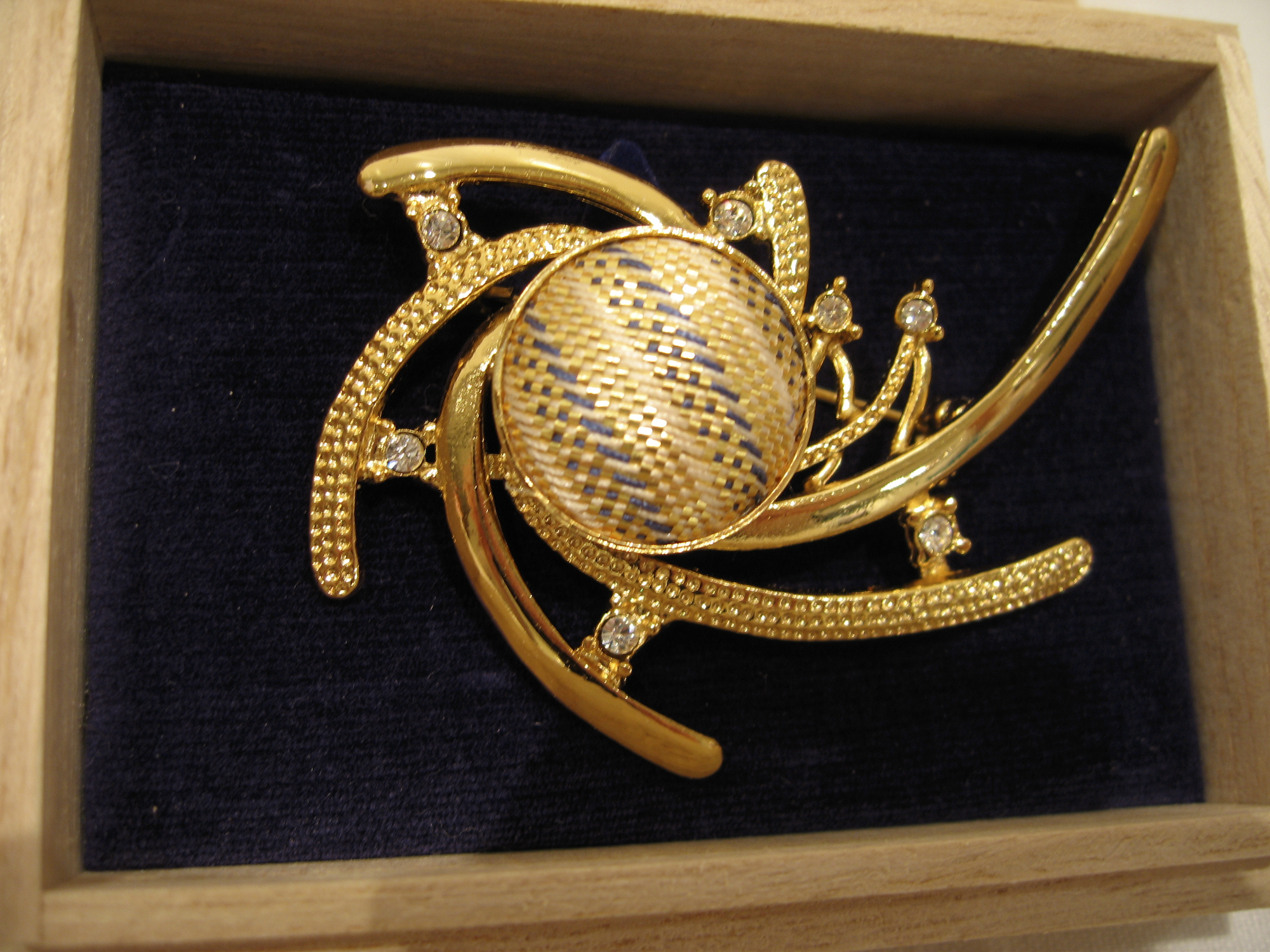
A brooch

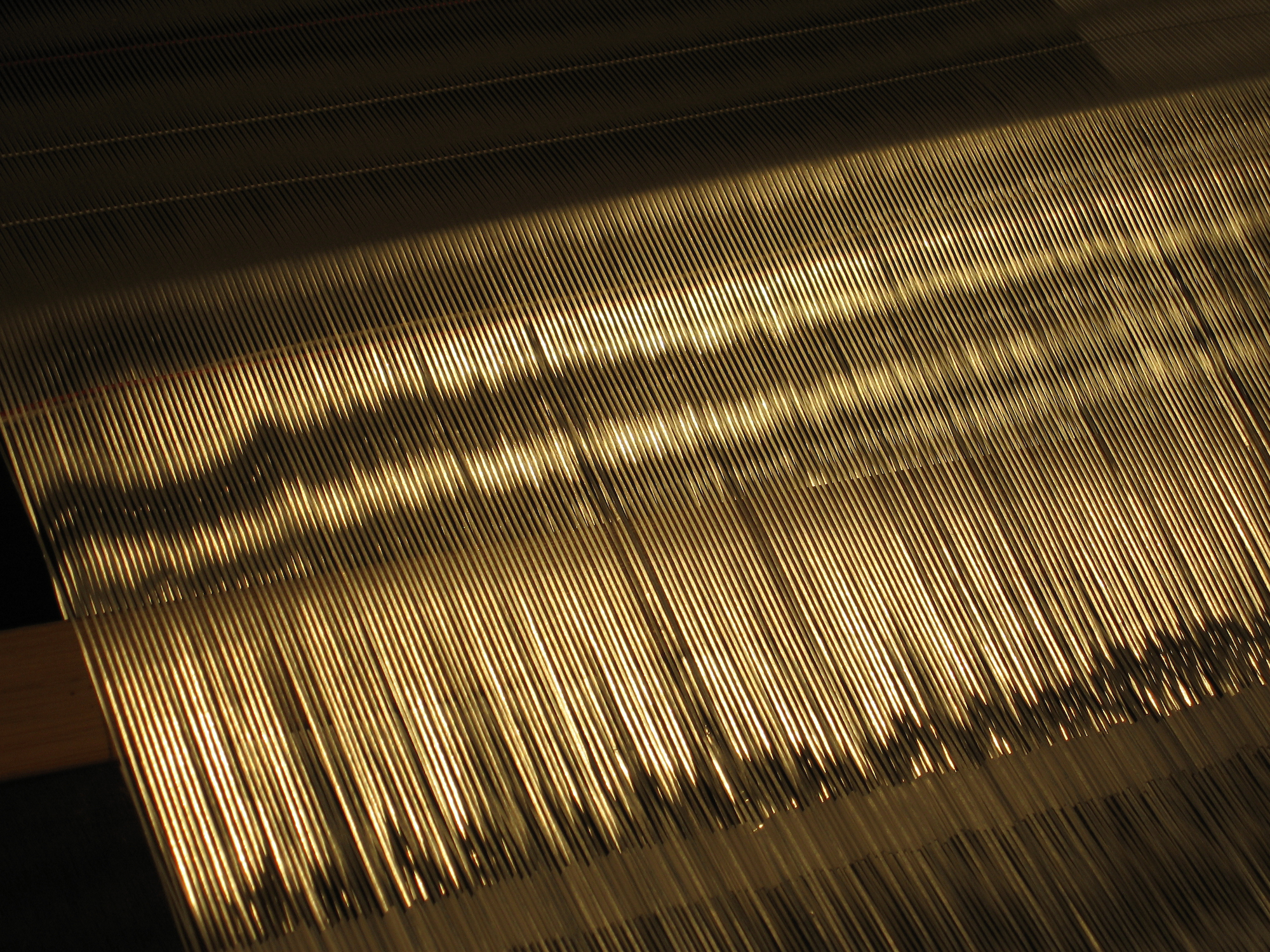
The gold threads used in the brocade

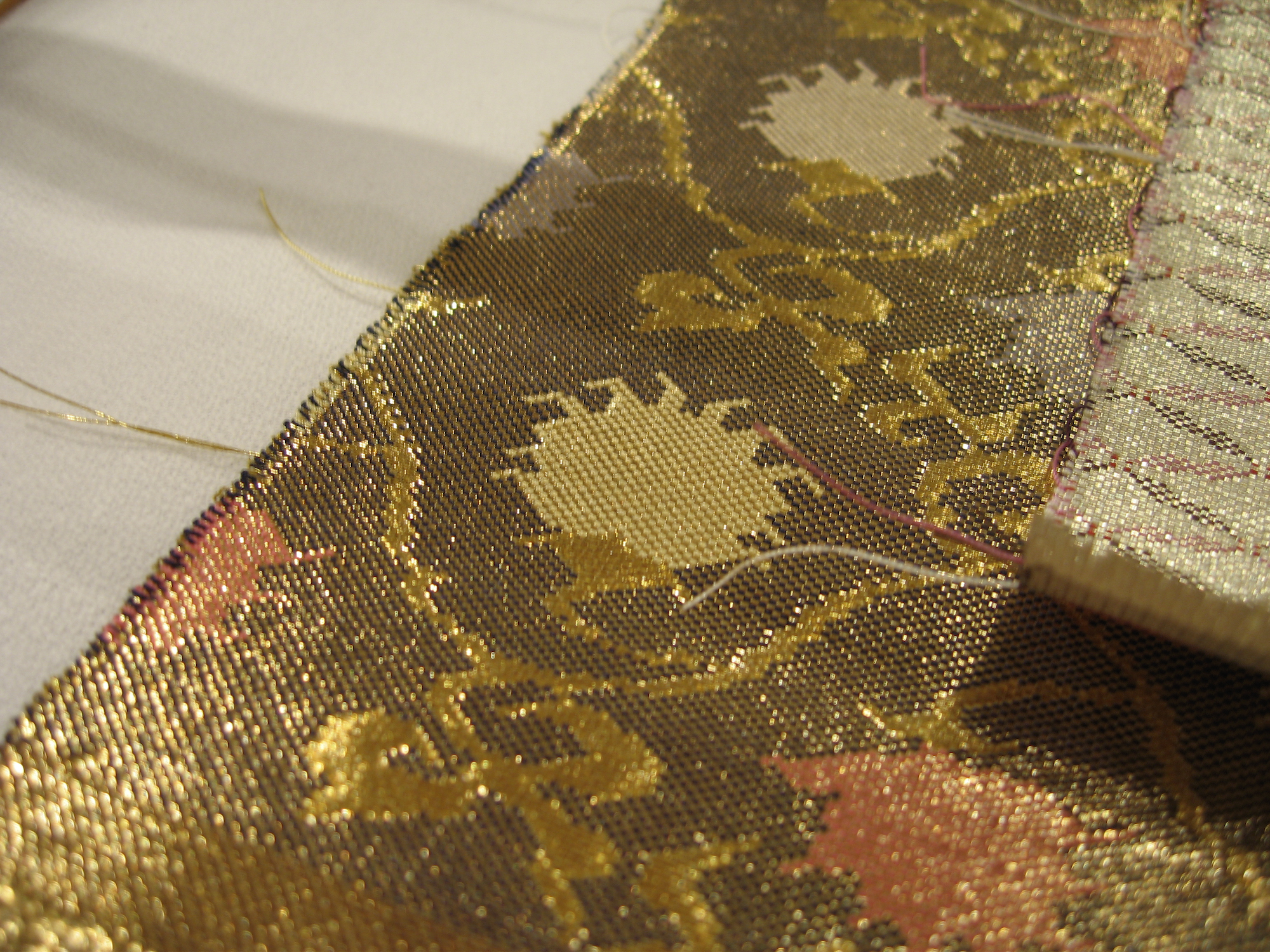
Detail of a Saga nishiki design
