= Echigo-jofu =

Fabric of Echigo, Japan

- Type: Fabric
- Material: Ramie
- Production method: Weaving
- Production process: Craft production
- Place of origin: Echigo, Japan

Echigo-jofu (越後上布) is a fabric of Echigo, Japan on national Important Cultural Properties listing in 1955, and UNESCO's Intangible Cultural Heritage of Humanity list since 2009. It is made from fine bast fiber from the ramie plant (Boehmeria nivea), also called hemp, although not directly related to cannabis hemp. (Note: See Morphological Differences Between Ramie and Hemp: How These Characteristics Developed Different Procedures in Bast Fiber Producing Industry; also see wikt:麻布) After it is woven on a jibata backstrap loom (地機), the fabric is spread on snowfields (yuki-zarashi) where ultraviolet light from the sun creates ozone and bleaches it white. Echigo-jofu has even been found in the Shōsōin repository from over 1,200 years ago. The production of Echigo-jofu is recorded in detail in Hokuetsu Seppu, the encyclopedic work of human geography describing life in the Uonuma area.

== Production ==
In the early 2000s, about 34 bolts were produced a year. It is now currently estimated at about 10 bolts a year.

== Uses ==
The fabric is used to make summer kimono and other traditional garments, cushions and bed linens.

== See also ==
- Snow bleaching
