= Camel Heda'a =

Arab oral tradition

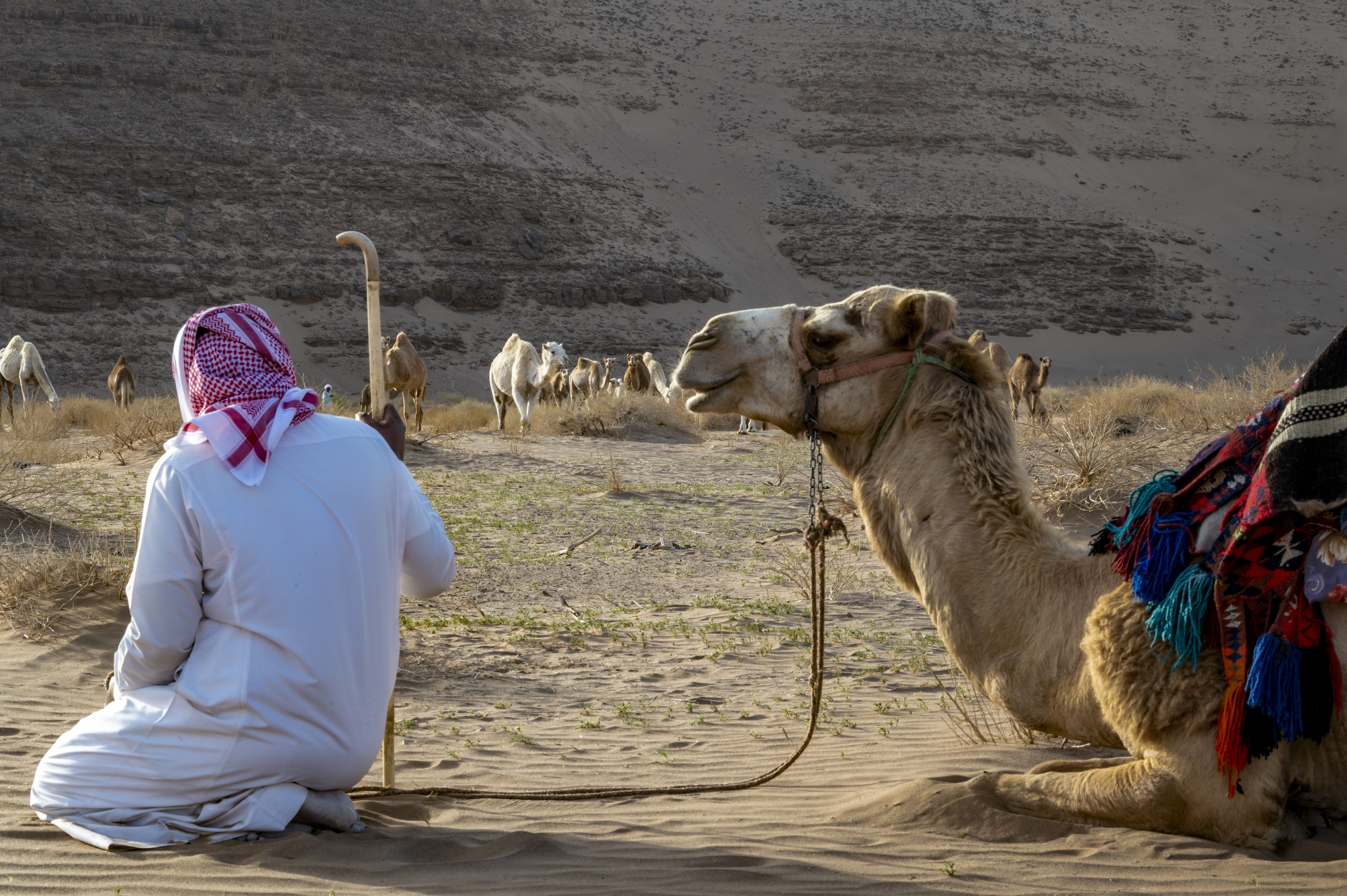
Camel herder with his flock

Camel Heda’a (Arabic: حداء الإبل, Heda’a Al Ebel) is an oral tradition of calling a flock of camels passed on through generations. It is one of the oral expressions in the Kingdom of Saudi Arabia, Oman and United Arab Emirates.

== Description ==
Camel Heda'a can be defined as a set of sounds made by camel herders to communicate with their flocks and deliver a specific message on different occasions. The camels interact with those sounds depending on the tone and how they are trained by herders.

== Location ==
Every place where camels are kept e.g. Arabian Peninsula. Practitioners of this element are found across many regions of the Kingdom, reflecting the long-standing tradition of camel herding throughout the vast expanse of the Arabian Peninsula.

== Inscription on UNESCO ==
On 30 November 2022, the Kingdom of Saudi Arabia, in cooperation with Sultanate of Oman and United Arab Emirates, succeeded in inscribing "AlHeda'a" on the Representative List of the Intangible Cultural Heritage of the United Nations Educational, Scientific and Cultural Organization (UNESCO).
