= Ijele Masquerade =

Traditional masquerade of the Igbo people, biggest masquerade in Sub-Saharan Africa

Ijele masquerade
- UNESCO Intangible Cultural Heritage
- Country: Nigeria
- Reference: 00194
- Region: Africa

Inscription history
- Inscription: 2009 (4th session)
- List: Representative

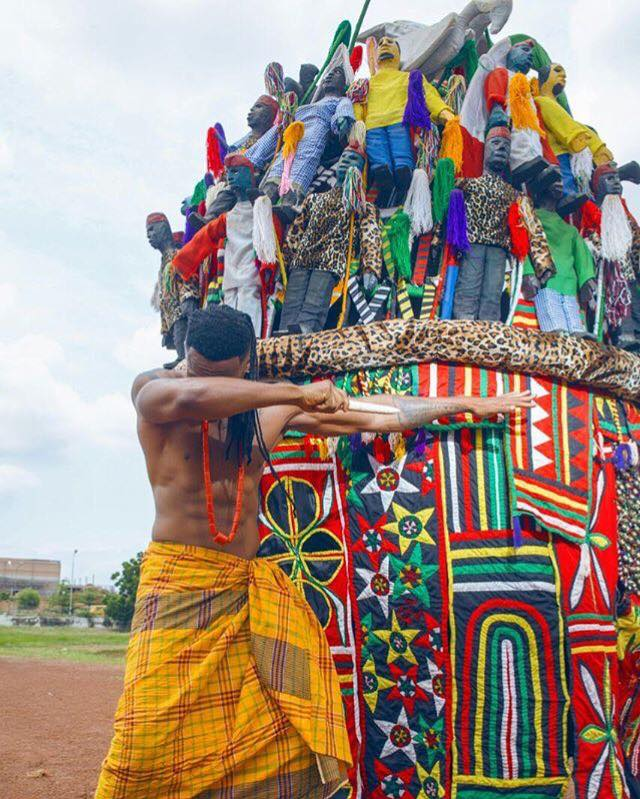
Ijele masquerade

Ijele Masquerade, known as the biggest Masquerade in Sub-Saharan Africa, is a tradition of the Igbo people of Nigeria. It is listed in UNESCO's representative list of Intangible Cultural Heritage of Humanity. In many communities in the state of Anambra in South-Eastern Nigeria, celebrations, burial ceremonies and other special occasions during the dry season to evoke fertility and a bountiful harvest feature the performance of the Ijele masquerade.

== Historical Origin ==
That Ijele originated from old Anambra State in Nigeria many centuries ago is not in doubt. According to UNESCO recent commentary The origin of Ijele according to available Oral story, emanated from Umueze Igboezunu Aguleri and Umuatolu Umueri It was this very group that performed the first "izi egwu ijele"(introduction of the Mask) to other communities like Aguleri, Nsugbe, Ogbunike, Nando, Awkuzu etc. It’s pertinent to note Umuatuolu Umueri was instrumental to the introduction of Ijele masquerades to Igbariamu, Nteje, and some other Villages outside Omabala areas.

In recognizing the roles played by Aguleri & Umuleri in the Origin of Ijele, the Old Anambra State Government unanimously selected their Ijele Cultural troupe, led by Chief Obiako Raphael Anizoba (Agunech'ibe)of Umuatuolu Umuleri and the Akunaeche Enyi Ijele cultural troupe from Igboezunu Aguleri to represent the State in Festival of Art & Culture known as FESTAC 1977 of which the groups won various Awards & accolades for excellence from the Federal Government in. 1977.

== Description ==
Ijele is the largest mask system ever to enter the history of the world masking tradition.

It comprises two segments: the upper and the lower segments, divided at the centre by a big python. The upper segment is called Mkpu Ijele while the lower segment is called Akpakwuru Ijele or Ogbanibe and the centre is called Eke - Ogba (Python). Ijele towers about 15 ft to 12 ft based on gravitational balance construction. It is built around the intricacy of multicolor cloths, bamboo sticks and canes in line with a creative hand element. Due to its weighty size, an outdoor big house must be prepared for Ijele anywhere it will perform. It takes about 100 men to work for six months in preparation of Ijele costumes and house before an outing performance.

== Relevance of the Masquerade ==
Ijele is a special masquerade in Anambra and Enugu State, Nigeria. It is the King of all Masquerades and as such has 45 different other masquerades perform on top of it in the olden days. Presently, the 45 masquerades are represented by the 45 figurines seen on top of Ijele. The myth and size of Ijele is wholesome as every aspect of life is depicted on Ijele. It is the climax of all masquerades hence performs alone and mostly last. Ijele is a family of 4: the mother; father; police and palm wine taper which will be discussed under the Ijele family below.

== Structure of the Masquerade ==
Nne Ijele meaning "Mother of Ijele". She is a usually beautiful lady masquerade that holds a big ox tail with a carved enamel plate. It performs dances to flute and soft music. Ijele Father called "Onuku": It has a big face and dresses in chieftaincy regalia.

Ijele Police: they are usually six. Their duty is to ensure that the people do not encroach on Ijele father or mother.

Ijele Palm Wine Tapper: It accompanies Ijele for the sole purpose of picking its rear as it performs. Another significant personality is the Ijele fan carrier of Akupe carrier. It is not really a masquerade but it plays crucial role of leading the Ijele with its symbolic powerful fan called Akupe. Once the Ijele loses sight of the fan and its carrier, it gets lost and it signifies danger. Ijele moves when the fan carrier moves and also stops when it stops.

== Ijele Music ==
Ijele has a special brand of band group that entertains it whenever he performs. It dances majestically to the royal band group called and known as "Igba-eze" - Royal Band group or literally known as drums of the Kings popularly called "Akunechenyi" in Igbo language. The musical instruments includes 4 drums, ogene, ubom, uyo, Ekwe, flute (Oja - ufele), wooden clapper (aja - oja) amongst others.

== Costumes & Symbols ==
Ijele Mirror: This mysterious mirror picks and sees anyone with charm or destructive weapons. The mirror magnets the person to Ijele for punishment. This mirror is reflective and creates an aesthetic beauty.

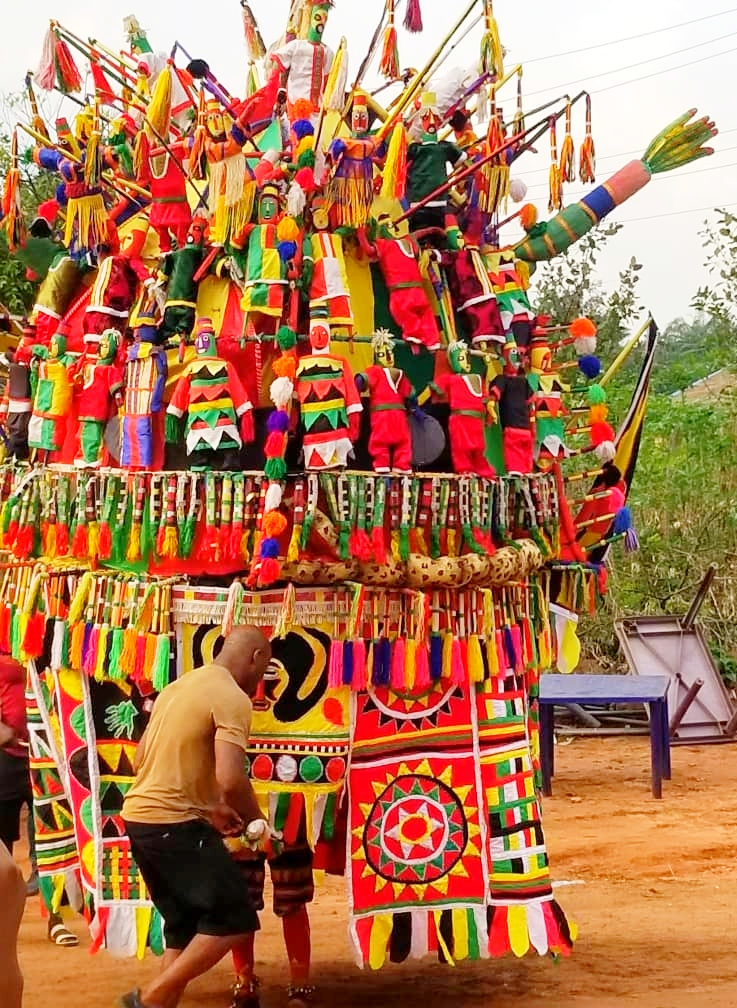
Ijele masquerade performance

Ijele Python: This is a big snake signifying royalty and mightiness of Ijele. Ijele Cloth / Fabrics: Ijele fabrics popularly known as Ododo is expensive, colorful velvety materials. Ijele has all colors but yellow, black and red are pronounced.

Ijele Trees, Animals, White men, Carved Human Activities: All these signifies wholesomeness of Ijele as every aspect of human life is depicted on Ijele masquerade.

Mermaid Objects: Ijele is crowned up with mermaid objects signifying Ijele as the greatest of all masquerades.

Ijele Horse: The horse represents majesty and greatness.

The Societal Impact & Significance of Ijele

Ijele has political, spiritual, social, psychological and recreational significance.

Spiritual / Social: Ijele performs at the burial ceremonies of great and powerful kings or special men and women in Igboland. It also performs at the burial ceremony of any member of the Ijele family or at the death of the oldest man in the community. Ijele mostly perform during the dry season to mark fertility and annual bountiful harvest. It can equally perform at special festivals and occasions.

Political: Ijele gives the people the opportunity to re-affirm their loyalty. This affirmation comes in different ways, for example, dancing alongside the Ijele as it pays homage to a Chief or King, show ones total loyalty. If Ijele can bow, who else can not bow!

Psychological: The appearance depicts a high tone of events when different facet of Igbo recreational activities is displayed. Though in some communities in Anambra State, it is restricted to young boys and girls singing and dancing to the tune of Akunechenyi music, which features very prominently during this session.

Recreational: Its appearance depicts a high tone of events when different facet of Igbo recreational activities is displayed. Though in some Communities in Anambra State, it is restricted to young boys and girls singing and dancing to the Akunechenyi music which features very prominently during the festivals.

Its worth to note that Ijele will never step out to perform unless Seven (7) Cannon gunshot are released to the air alongside the sound of its royal music. Therefore, its would be nice to sum it up that Ijele is a Spiritual bond between a range of Communities in Anambra State of Nigeria which is harbinger of peace, amity, dialogue and a high sense of communality.
