= Traditional marriage in Hausa culture =

Traditional marriage in Hausa Culture
- Marriage
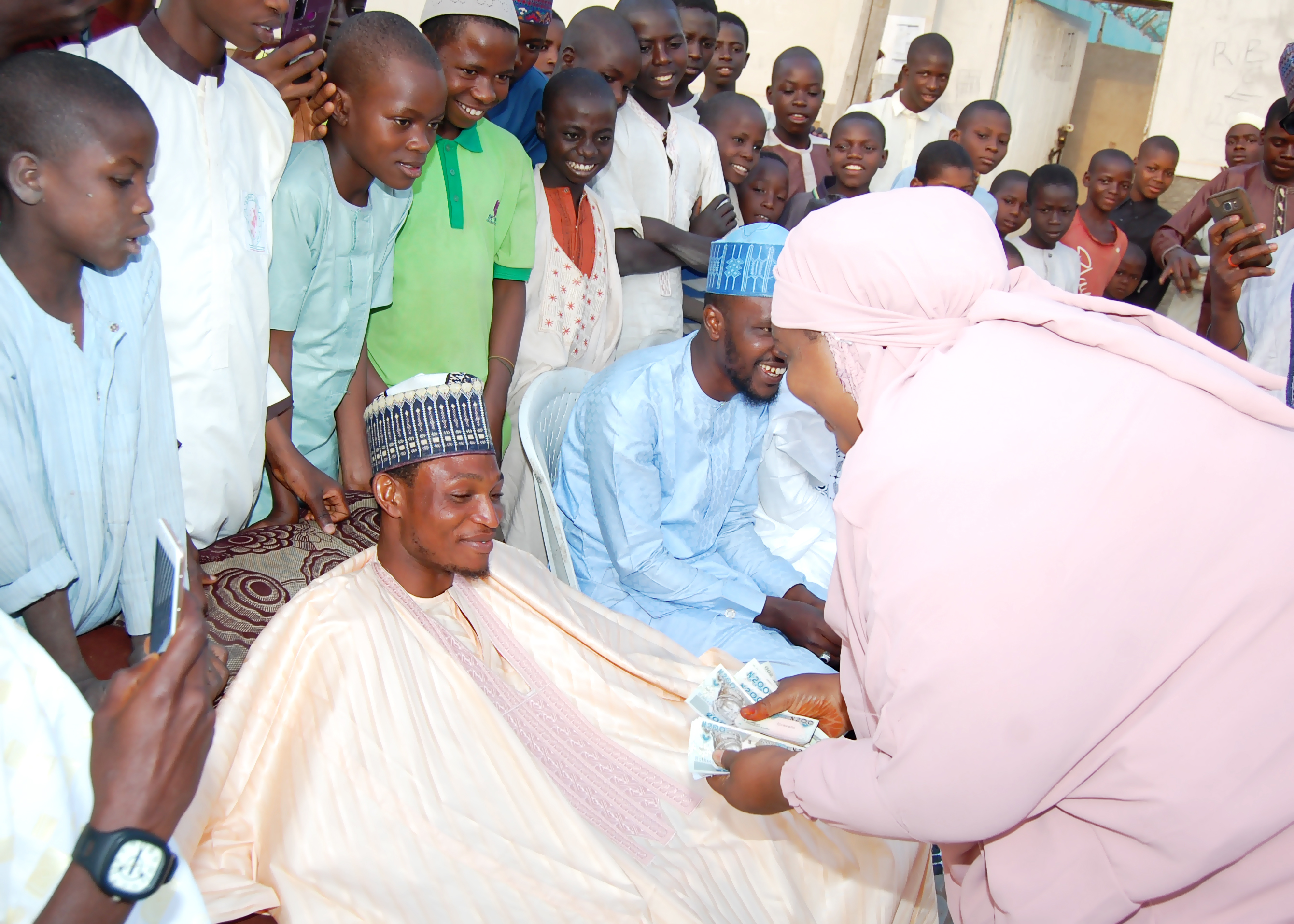
- Ethnicity: Hausa
- Location: Northern Nigeria
- Language: Hausa Language
- Religion: Muslim

About a quarter of Nigeria's population are Hausa. They are predominantly Muslim. They speak the Hausa language, although different tribes speak different dialects. Hausa traditional marriage is not as expensive as other forms of marriage in Nigeria. Hausa traditional marriage is based on Islamic or Sharia law.

In this tradition, a man seeks his parents' consent when he finds a woman he intends to marry. After the parents have given their consent, the other marital rites follow suit. These stages include Na Gani Ina so, Sadaki, the wedding or Daura Aure/Shafa Fatiha, and Kai Amariya.

== Na Gani Ina so ==
In the Hausa language, this means "I have found and I love it". This is a stage when the man with his family members goes to the woman's house to make their intention known to her parents. They carry along with them some items such as kolanuts, bags of salt, sweets and chocolate. If these items were accepted by the bride's parents, that means they have agreed to give out their daughter's hand in marriage to the groom's family. It is now left for the family of the bride to communicate to the groom's family of their approval of the marriage. This process is called "Gaisuwa". Before this they might have done their enquiry concerning the man seeking to marry their daughter to ascertain his moral, religious, and social belief, and to also know his family background. The bride and the groom to be are not allowed to have any physical contact until they are properly married. After this process the couple become engaged and both families start working towards the wedding and setting of date. The process of fixing the wedding date is called Sa rana

== Sadaki ==
This is the stage of paying the bride price or dowry. It starts with a minimum amount called Rubu Dinar in Hausa, ranging to the highest amount the groom can afford to pay. Islamic tradition teaches that a lesser dowry paid produces a more blessed marriage. The money being paid as bride price is being announced to the hearing of everyone present. The bride price could be money paid in cash, installments, or in labor. As for a divorced woman or a widow, she gets to decide her bride price.

== Lefe ==
Lefe refers to the items that groom purchase for the bride.

== Wedding Fatiha ==
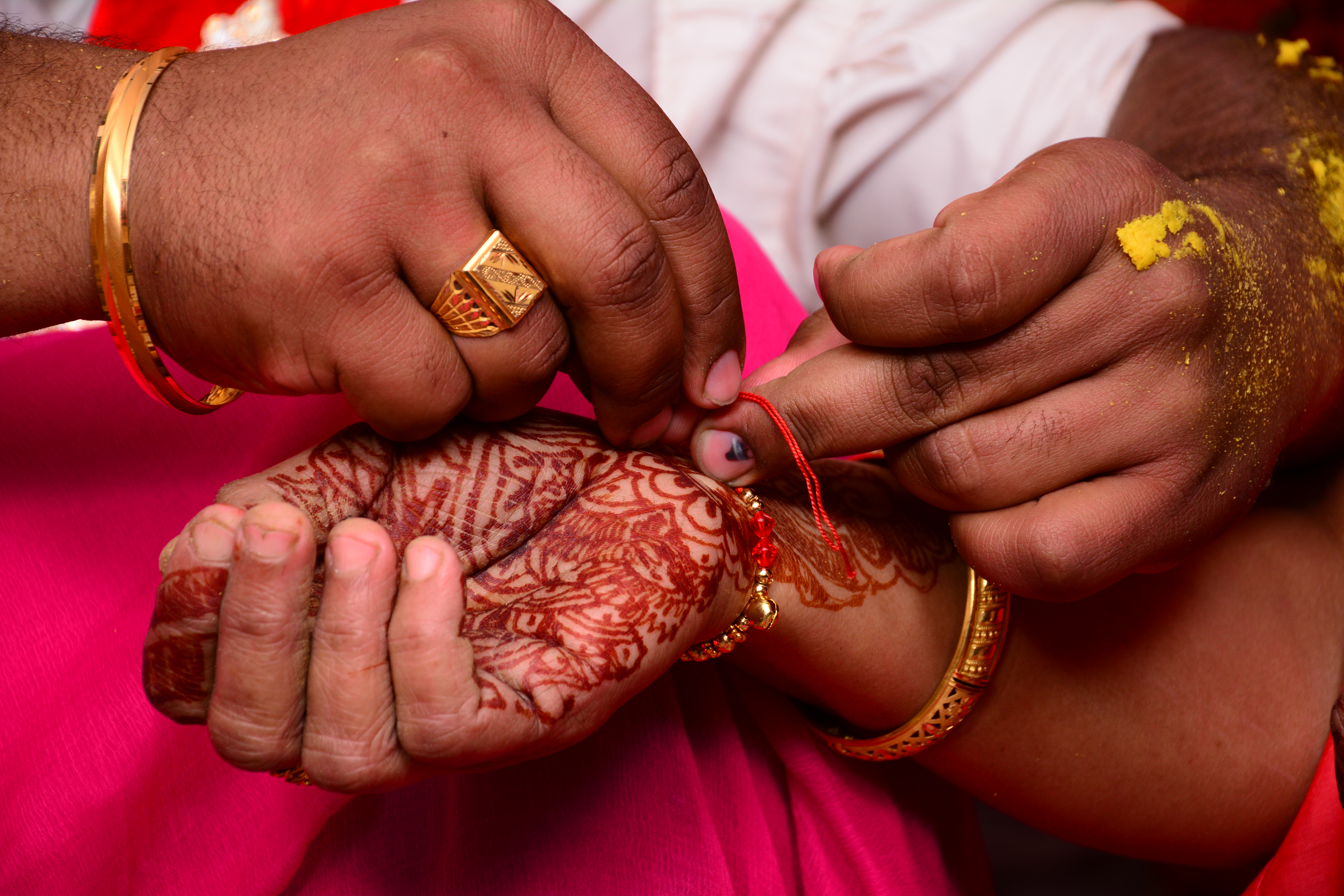
A bride with henna decoration

The wedding date is called the Fatiha. The wedding Fatiha used to organize inside the mosque after Friday prayer (jumu'a prayer) and it only consists of men like the husband, father of the groom, friends of the groom, witnesses, and people that attended the jumu'a prayer.

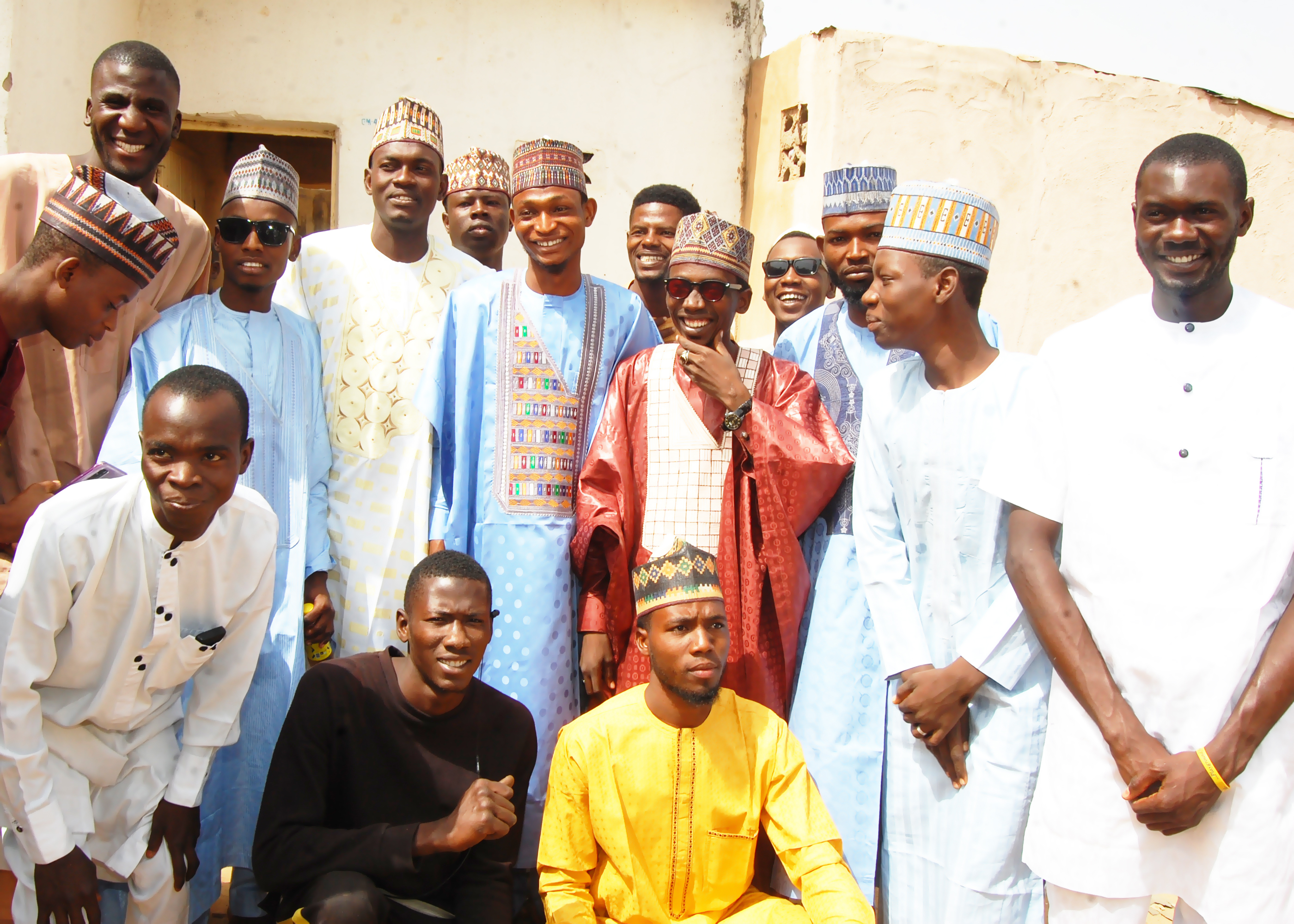
Hausa traditional wedding Fatiha
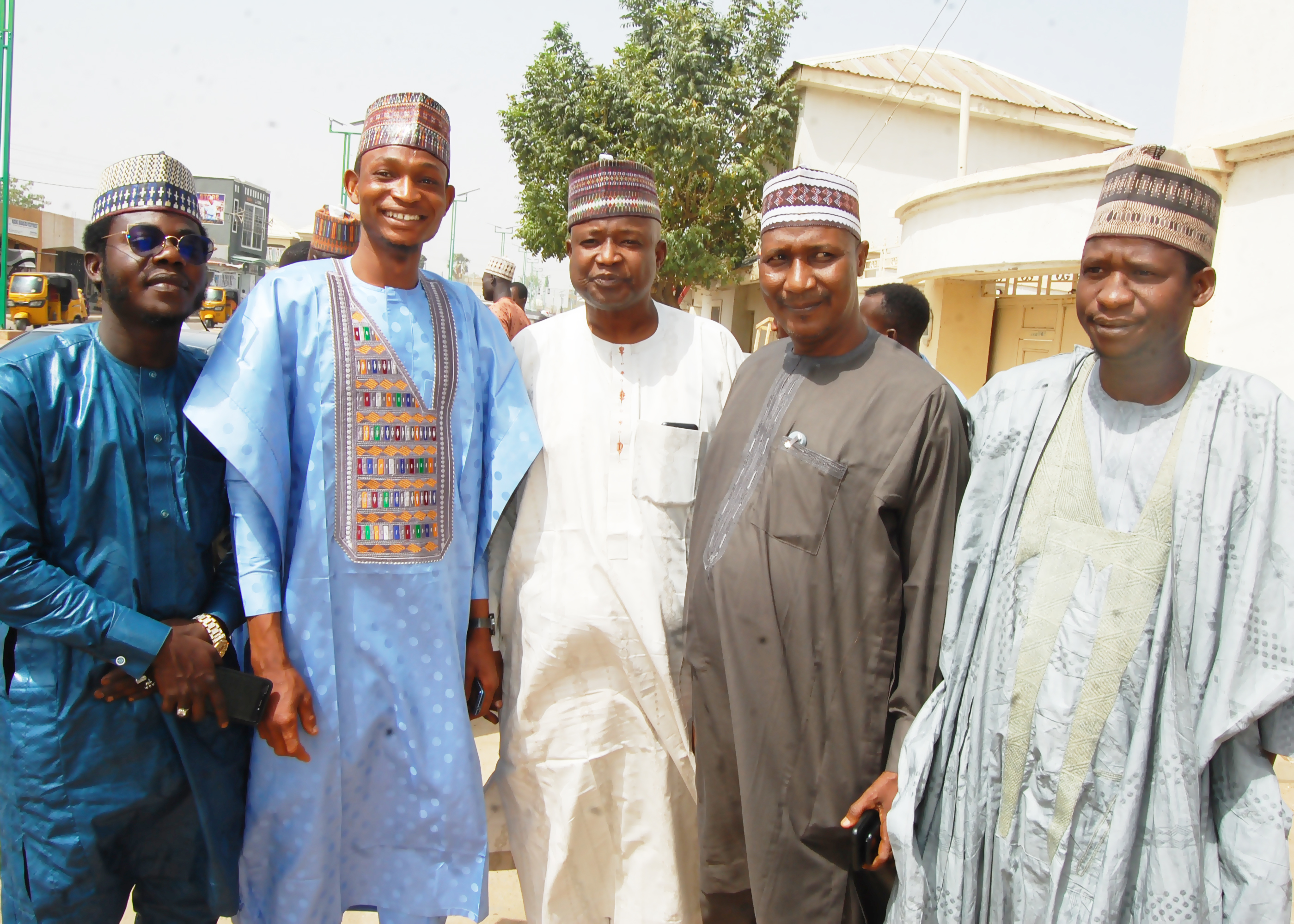
Hausa traditional wedding Fatiha

Women are not expected to be seen in the wedding Fatiha, rather they are to be with the bride celebrating her last day as a single woman and also prepare her for the married life. The bride gets to sit in the midst of her female friends, relax, and paint her fingers and feet with henna, and her friends also paint theirs too. This tradition is known as sa lalle (meaning putting on the henna) as it reaches the time of this henna party the husbands family or the groom sends items such as henna amongst other things which would be used in this ceremony. The bride in Hausa is called Amarya whereas the groom is called Ango.

At the wedding reception, food and drinks are served to the guests. In Hausa tradition, it is the duty of the husband to rent an empty house while the responsibility of furnishing it is the responsibility of the bride's family.

== Kai Amarya ==
After the wedding, the bride is being accompanied to her husband's home to be well welcomed by the groom's family. They chant songs on their way and carry all the bride's belongings with them.

== See also ==
- Traditional marriage in Igbo culture
