= Traditional marriage in Igbo culture =

Igbo marriage traditions

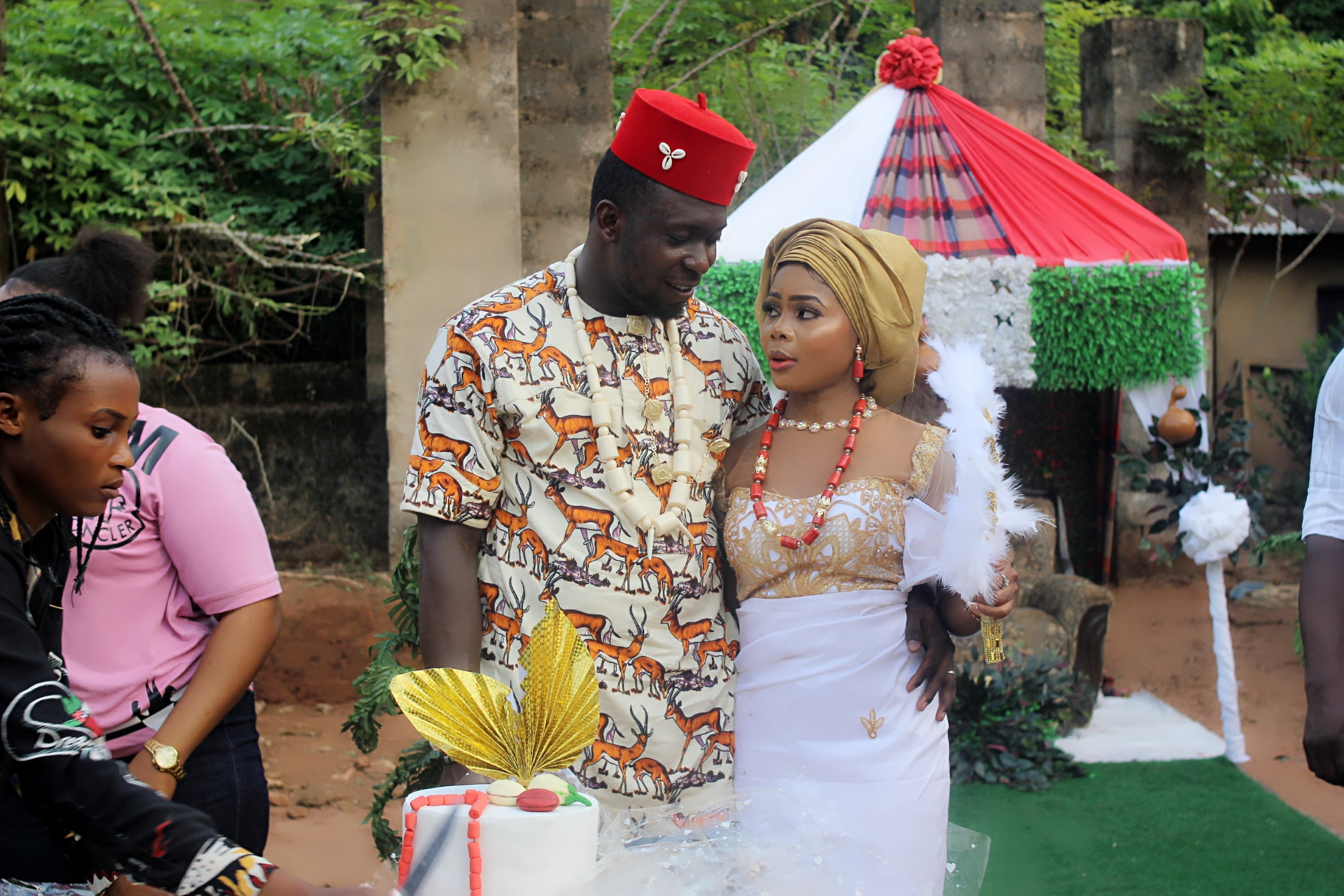
A couple getting married under the traditional Igbo rite

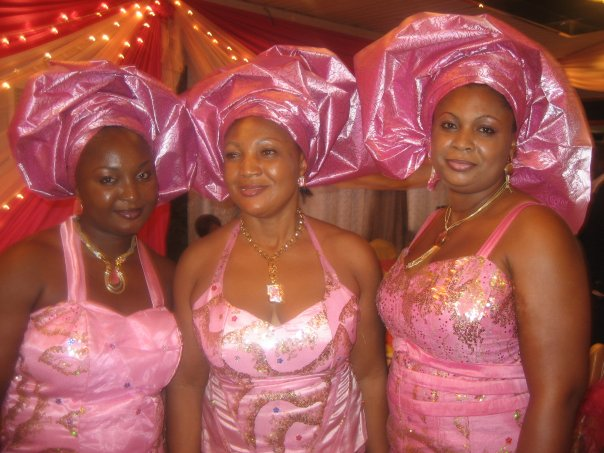
Igbo women at a wedding

The Igbo traditional marriage, known as Igba Nkwu (meaning "wine carrying") in the Igbo language, is a significant cultural ceremony among the Igbo people of southeastern Nigeria. This multi-step process involves various customs and rituals that formalize the union between a man and a woman, emphasizing family involvement, cultural heritage, and communal celebration part of the Igbo culture.

== Key stages ==
For a traditional Igbo marriage to be considered valid and effective, the couple must complete a series of key steps that involve both families and the wider community. These steps ensure that the union is culturally recognized, strengthens family ties, and preserves the values and traditions of the Igbo people.

Igba Nkwu

1. Iku-Aka (Knocking on the Door): The groom's family visits the bride's family to formally announce the groom's intention to marry their daughter. This visit is typically led by the groom's father or an elder and serves as the initial step in seeking the bride's hand in marriage. As part of the reception, the bride's family presents kola nut (ọjị in Igbo), which is blessed and broken by an elder to welcome the visitors and mark the beginning of the marriage proceedings.
2. Ịjụ Asị/Ese: (Background Check) After both families have been made aware of their children's intent to marry, they shall then conduct background checks on each other. In the Igbo culture, it is nsọ ani/ala (forbidden) to marry a relation including extended family member, marry from the same village or even from the mother's village (Ikwu nne), up to ten generations removed. This stage allows both families to ensure that they are not in any way related. It also allows them to check whether either of the families committed any nsọ anị/ala or not, if they are Osu, or have any hereditary illnesses.
3. Ihe-Ụmụnna (Engagement with Extended Family): If both families are satisfied with the results from their background checks, the groom's family meets with the bride's extended family, known as Ụmụnna. This gathering allows both families to discuss the union, share family histories, and ensure broader compatibility.
4. Ime Ego (Bride Price Negotiation and Payment): Bride price or dowry is usually a long process where a list of requirements are presented to the groom's family. This can be done in batches. The groom's family presents the "agreed-upon bride price" and other customary gifts to the bride's family. The amount is often symbolic and varies by region. Fulfilment of this payment signifies the groom's commitment and establishes the woman's new familial bonds and formal entry into the husband's family.
5. Ịga Nleta/ Nleta Ala (Visiting the groom's family). Here, the bride-to-be visits the intended groom's family and stays for sixteen days (four Igbo market weeks). This allows them to ascertain behavioral compatibility. Sometimes, the groom's family evaluates her ability to manage a home or cook. The bride-to-be also assesses her ability to fit into her future home. At the end of the four Igbo market weeks, she then returns home with gifts from the groom's family to be, which signals approval, otherwise, the marriage process ends here.
6. Ịgba Nkwụ (Wine Carrying Ceremony): The central event of the traditional marriage is the Ịgba Nkwụ, where the bride carries a cup of palm wine in the company of her friends (Ụmụagbọ) to search for her groom among the guests. Upon finding him, she sips out of the wine, and offers him the rest, and he drinks from it. This symbolizes their union. This act is witnessed by both families and the community, marking the formalization of the marriage.
7. Idu Ụlọ/Ụnọ (Escorting the bride home): After Ịgba Nkwụ, the bride is escorted to her new home the following night. She is ccompanied by her unmarried female relations and friends known as ụmụagbọ, and young men sent by the husband to receive her. The ritual is conducted amid singing and celebration, with songs marking the bride's beauty and her transition into womanhood. Friends and relations present gifts including money, domestic utensils, livestock, and jewelry, usually to start her new home. At the entrance of the compound, the bride is received by the women of the groom's family and community (Ndị Inyom Di)
8. Amaram/ Amalụm Ụzọ Ọgọ (Knowing the bride's new home). This is the final post-marriage process usually done after twenty-eight days (seven Igbo market weeks or otu ọnwa). The bride's family and selected persons from the community visits the bride in her husband's home. This allows both families to be better acquainted. The bride's family also use this opportunity to assess the well-being of their daughter and to ensure she's being treated well by her husband's family.

== Social groups in Igbo traditional Marriage ==
Traditional Igbo marriage ceremonies known as Igba Nkwu are communal events involving the participation of various kinship groups, social associations, and ceremonial attendants associated with the lineage of the bride and groom. These groups include the Umuagbo (bridesmaids), Umunna (Patrilineal Kindred), Umuada (Daughters of the lineage), Otu ogbo (Age grades), among others. The igba nkwu ceremony emphasises traditional Igbo values on kinship. Accordingly, these kinship form part of the ceremony and perform various roles in Igba Nkwu, depending on the community.

=== Umuagbo (Maids of honour) ===
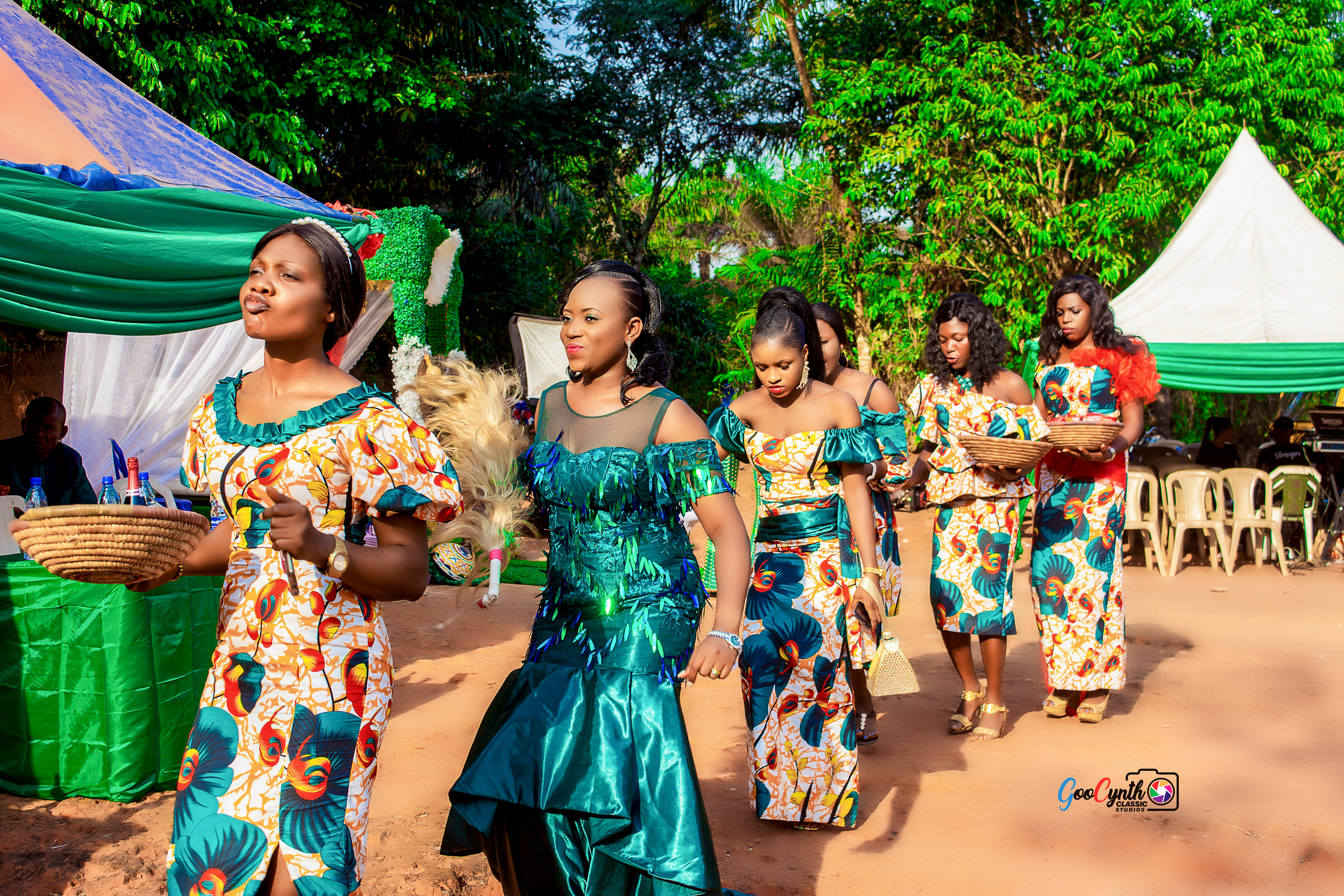
Umuagbo (Maids of honour)

Maids of honour formed part of traditional Igbo marriage.They are bridal attendants who accompany the bride during the marriage process. They can be made up of maidens from the families, kin, friends and associates of the bride. Accounts of Igbo marriage and courtship customs in 1920 describe them as forming part of the bride's entourage throughout the celebrations. The brides were known as Nkpu girls. The attendants were adorned in the same decorative appearance and accompanied the bride in public parades and processions through the community. During these festivities, the bride and her attendants danced before spectators, attracting crowds who gathered to watch the celebrations.

Dancing was a prominent part of the festivities, with brides in company of their maidens performing energetically before spectators for public admiration and recognition and received gifts in her Calabash placed at her feet. The bridesmaids carried large fans, which were used to cool and refresh the bride after dancing. The participation of the bridal maidens extended throughout the celebrations, during which they remained in attendance of the bride. They also escorted the bride home, a rite known as idu ulo.

=== Umuada (Daughters of the lineage) ===
The Umuada are the first daughters of the lineage who also form part the Igbo traditional marriage process. They can sometimes act as intermediaries providing guidance to potential suitors from their husbands' communities in finding suitable brides from their kindreds. This constitute a form of marriage arrangement between interested young men and women. In the absence of the bride and the groom, they can also collaborate with family members and other extended family members or social groups like the Umunna to perform the marriage rites on their behalf.

During the marriage rites, the Umuada are also presented with items from the groom which can be money, drinks and foodstuff.

During the Igbankwu ceremony, they also play supportive roles towards the bride like the umuagbo such as singing songs and collaborating in doing the rites of idu ulo (escorting the bride home)

== Traditional wedding attire and accessories ==
In Igbo traditional weddings, both the bride and groom wear attire that is culturally significant and richly adorned. The bride typically wears a brightly colored blouse and double wrapper, often made from Ankara, Akwaete, Akwa Ọcha, jioji or lace. The first wrapper is usually draped around the body from the waist to the ankle, while the second one overlaps the first from the waist to the knees, which gives the wrapper a layered look. This is then complemented by a big head tie known as ichafu-isi and can be called nnukwu ichafu and by some Igbo dialects as Akwa-isi, Akishi, Unali/Ulari, Ichafo or Içafo in some older texts. She also wears waist beads (mgbaji), which symbolize femininity, fertility, and beauty, as well as beaded necklaces and bracelets, often made from coral, to indicate status and cultural pride. Decorative hand fans Akupe are used to accentuate elegance during the ceremony. The groom commonly wears an embroidered shirt or tunic called isi agu, or akwa ọgọdọ, paired with matching trousers and a small cap (okpu agu), with an Eagle's feather (Abụba/ugbene ugo) inserted in the cap for Ndị Nze na Ọzọ. Additional accessories for the groom may include coral necklaces, bracelets, or a walking stick as a symbol of authority. Key ceremonial items such as a palm wine cup for the Igba Nkwu (wine-carrying) ritual, traditionally done in a gourd (Ụgba), buffalo horn (Mpi Atụ) or cow horn (Mpi ehi/efi), and decorative hand fans or umbrellas, are also integral to the wedding. Together, these elements reflect the values, traditions, and communal identity of the Igbo people.

== Inculturation and syncretism in Igbo-Christian weddings ==
The introduction of Christianity to Igboland in the late nineteenth centuries created new dynamics in marriage practices. Missionaries initially rejected many aspects of the traditional Igbo wedding (Igba Nkwu Nwanyi), including the invocation of ancestors and ritual libations, and promoted the church wedding as the only valid form of matrimony. This produced tensions, as the Igbo community continued to regard the traditional ceremony as the authentic seal of marriage.

Over time, a process of inculturation allowed elements of Igbo custom to be integrated into Christian practice. In contemporary church weddings, families may include symbolic aspects of the wine-carrying ritual, while Igbo music, proverbs, dance, and attire are increasingly accepted within liturgical settings. The Catholic Church in particular, following the recommendations of the Second Vatican Council, has encouraged adaptations that affirm local culture while retaining Christian sacramental theology.

Alongside formal inculturation, widespread syncretism has developed at the popular level. Many couples perform both the traditional Igba Nkwu and the church wedding, seeing the former as the true cultural validation of marriage and the latter as its spiritual confirmation. In practice, the two rites are often blended, with families maintaining bridewealth negotiations and communal feasts alongside priestly blessings. This dual system reflects the persistence of ancestral traditions within a predominantly Christian society.

== See also ==
- Traditional marriage in Hausa culture

== Gallery ==
Igba nkwu, Igbo traditional marriage

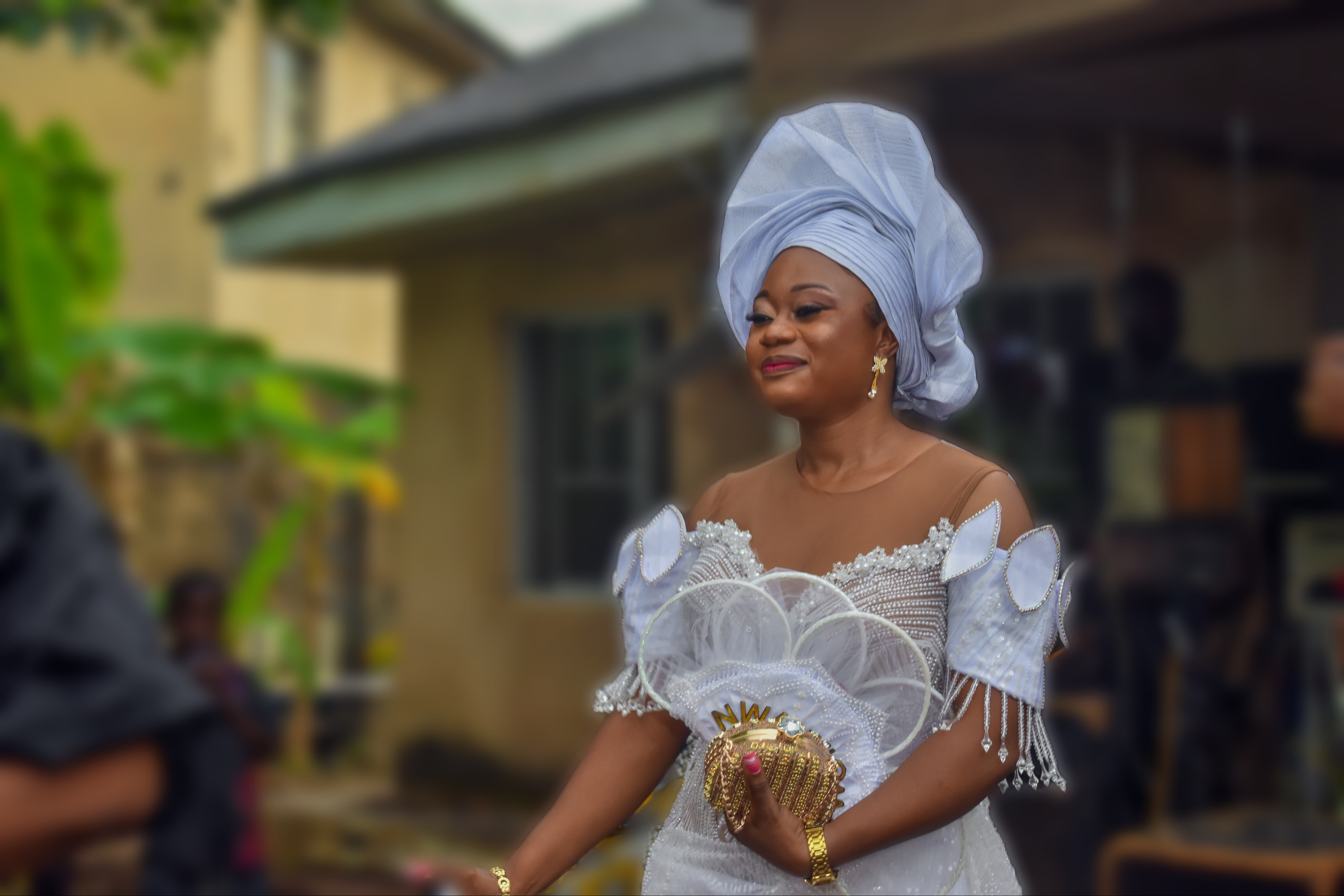

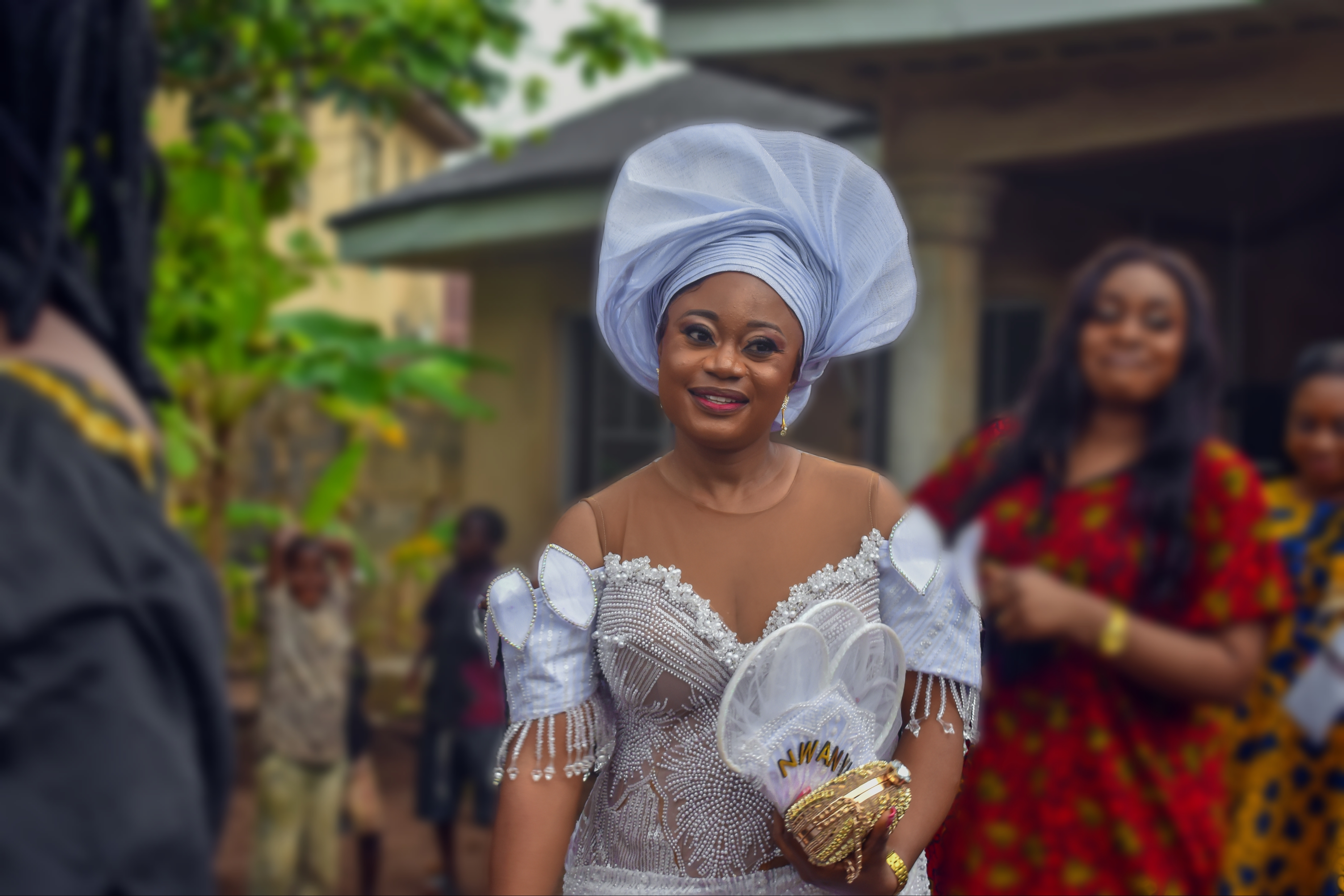

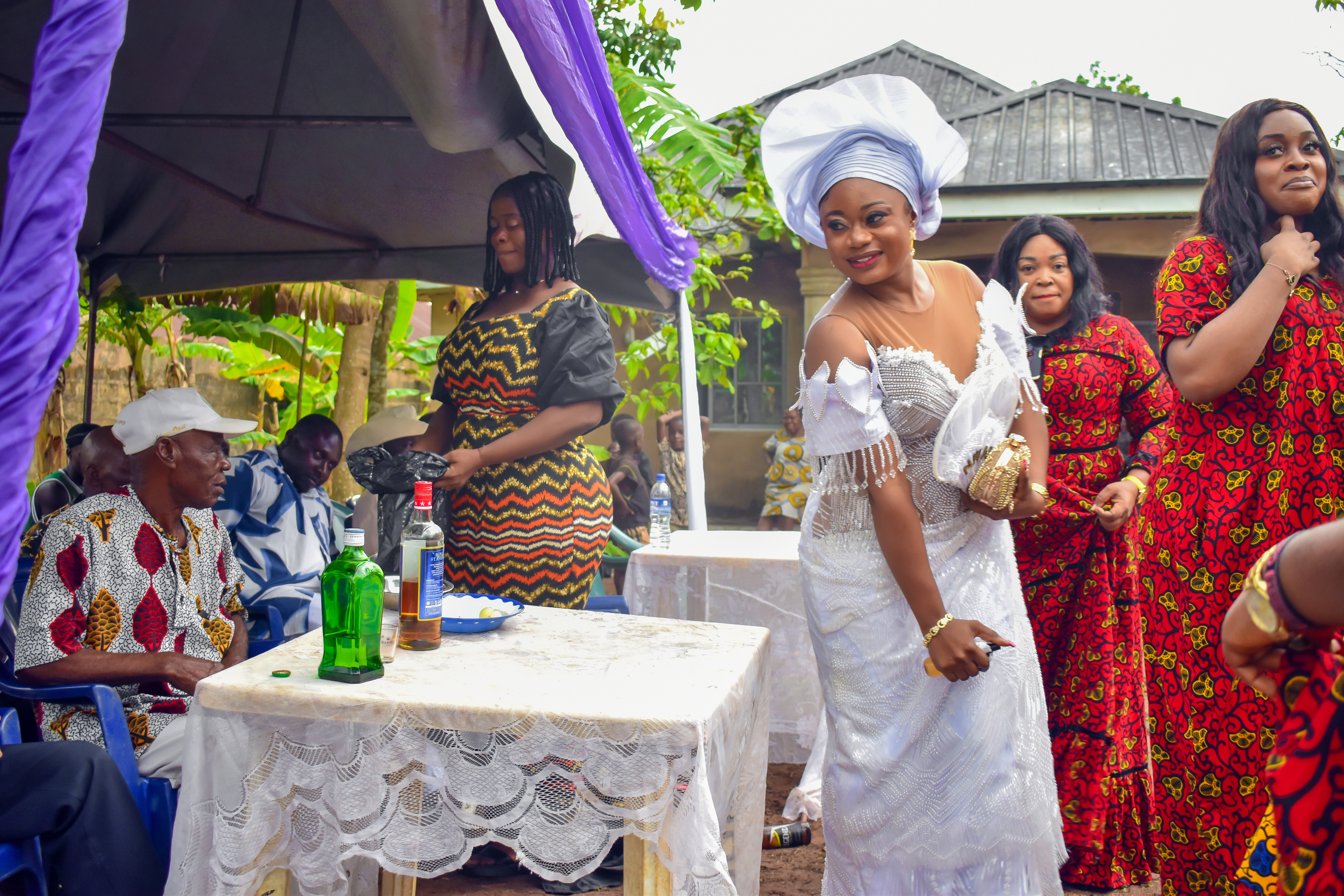

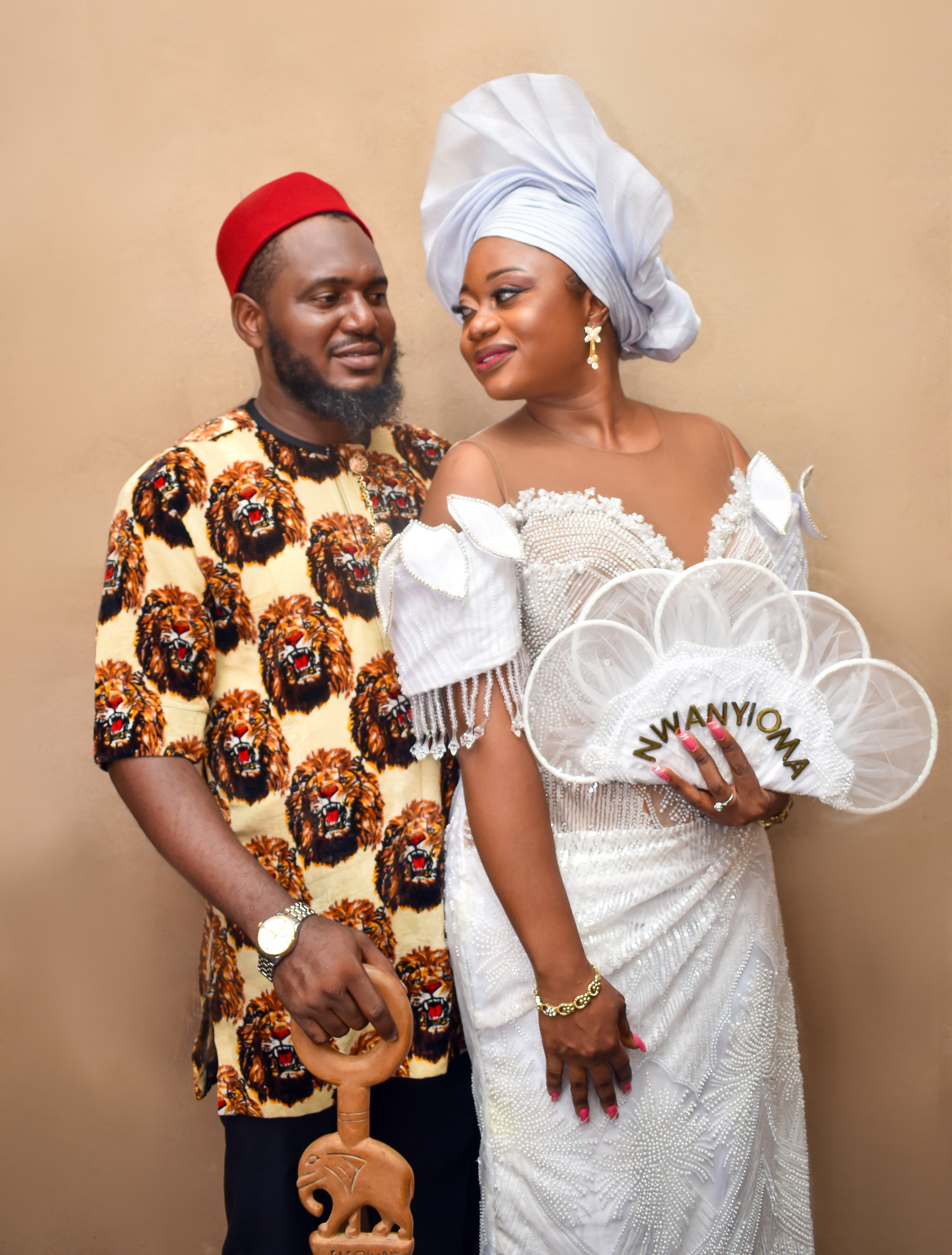

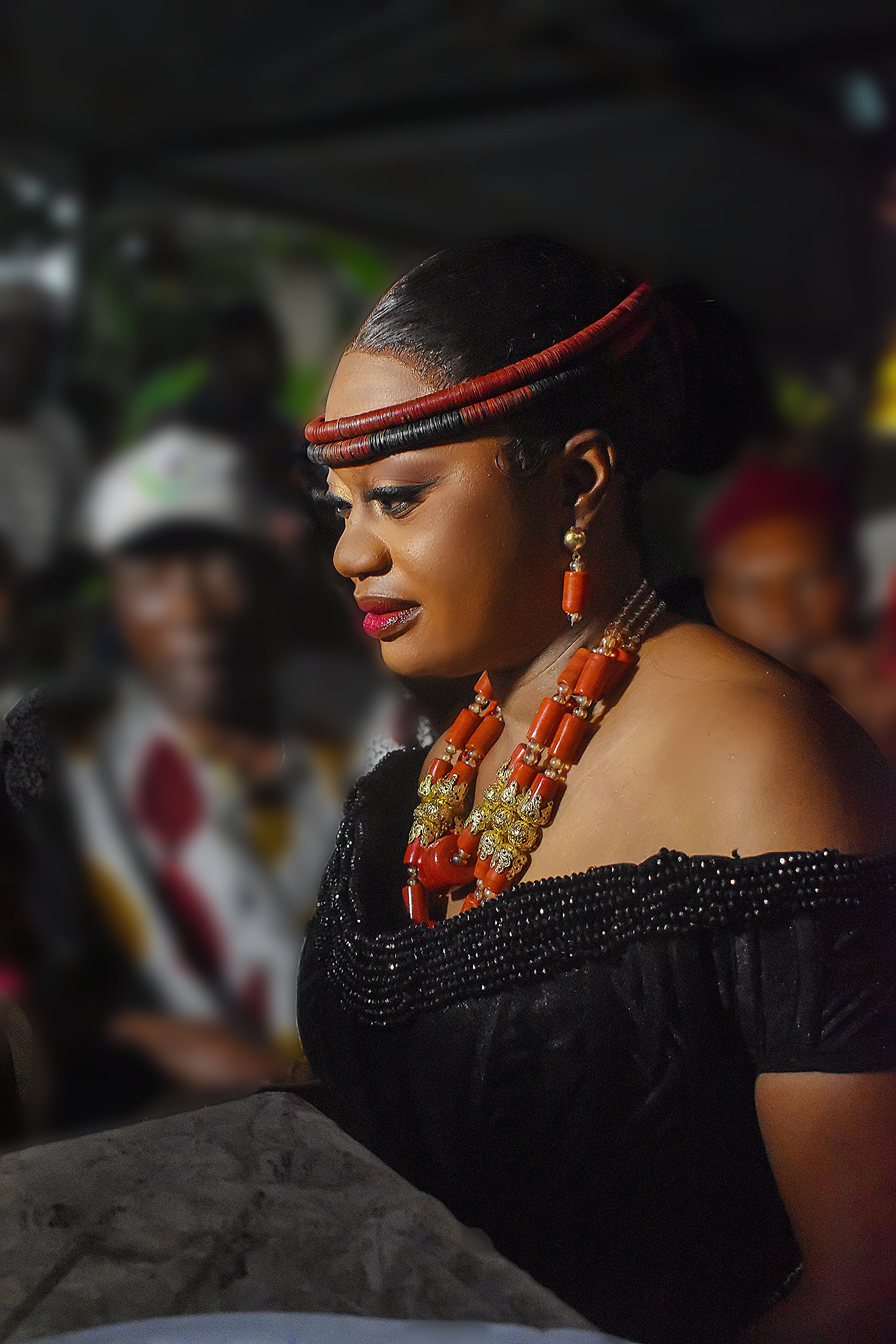

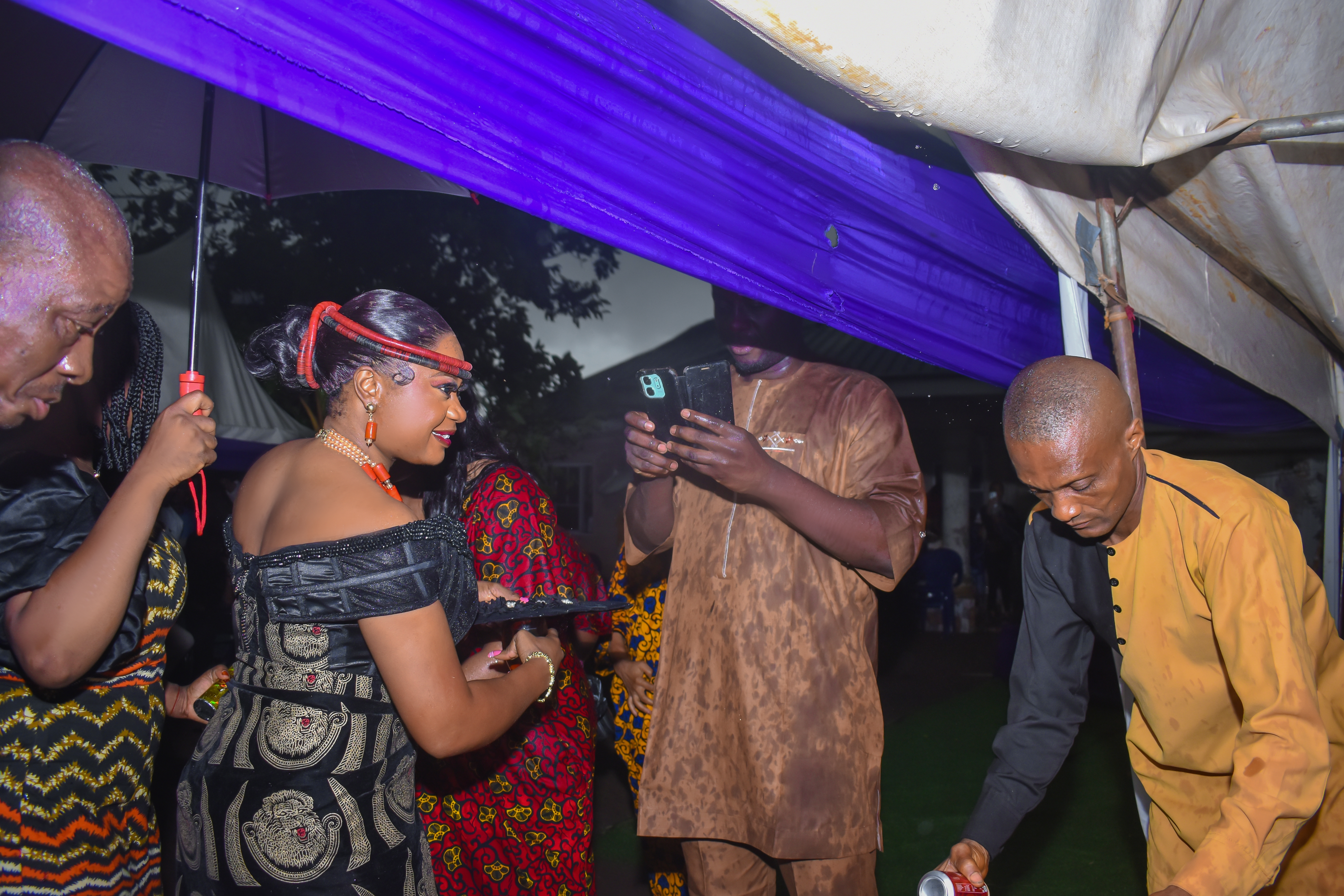

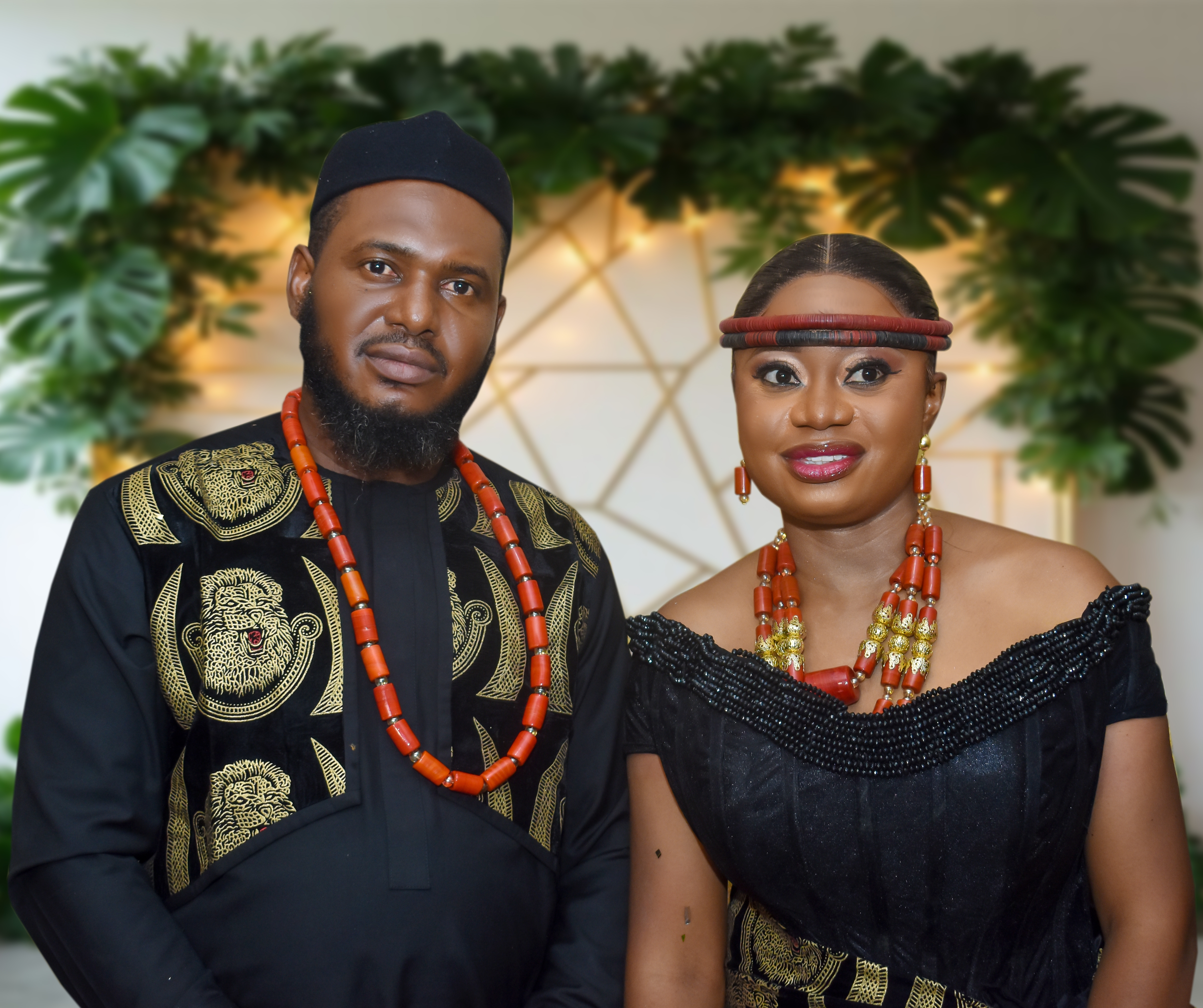

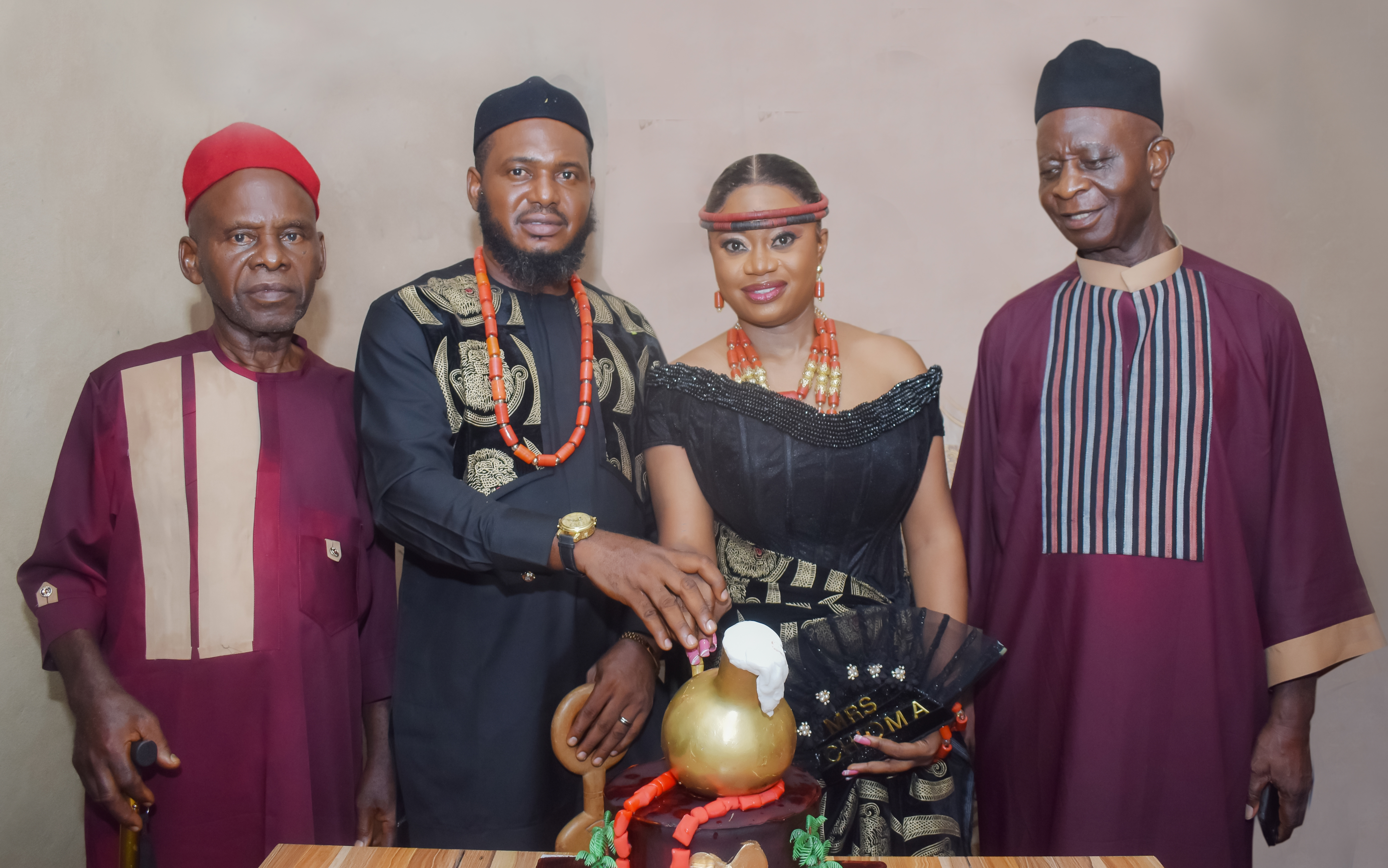

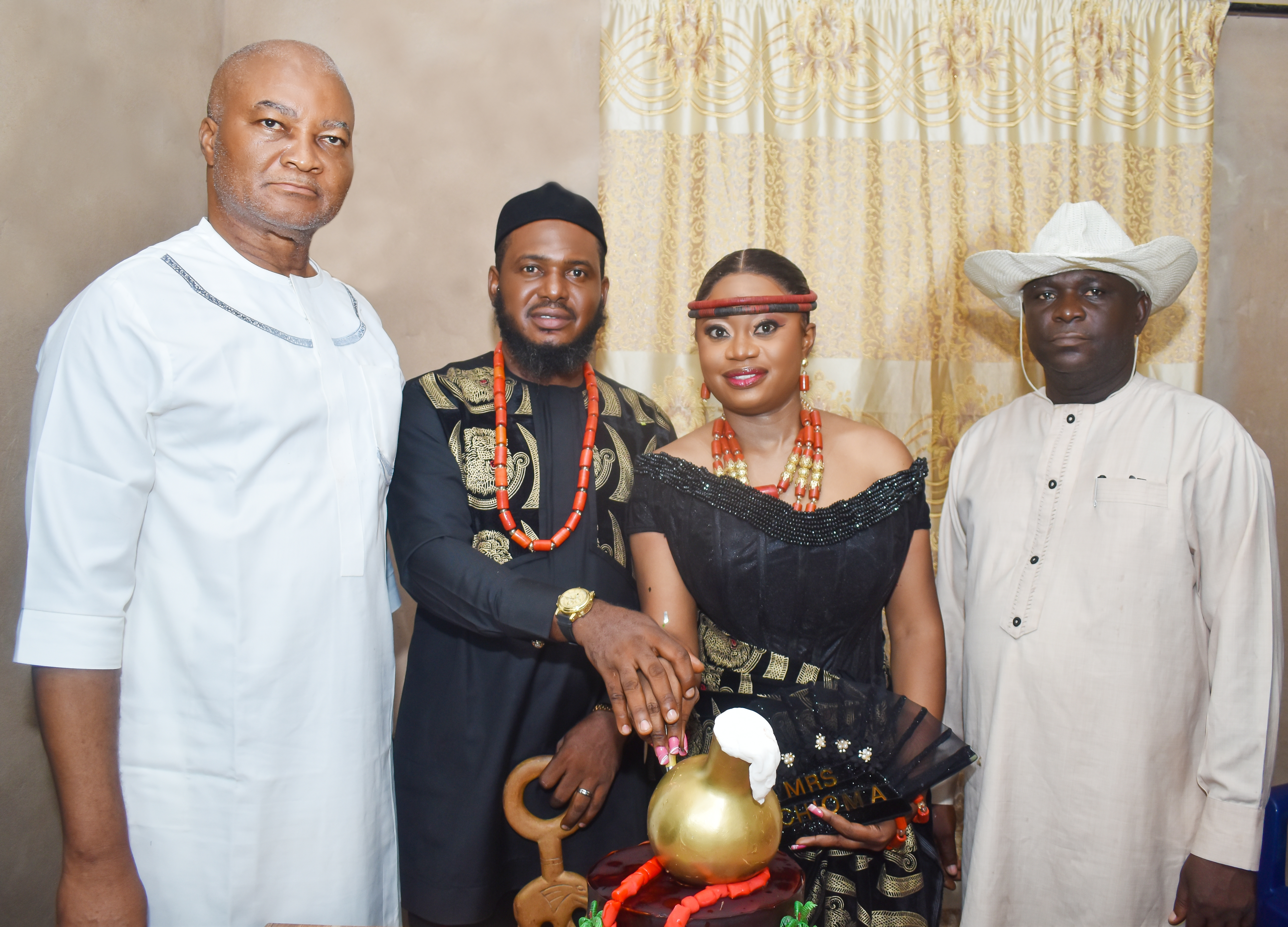
