= Akupe (hand fan) =

Igbo hand fan

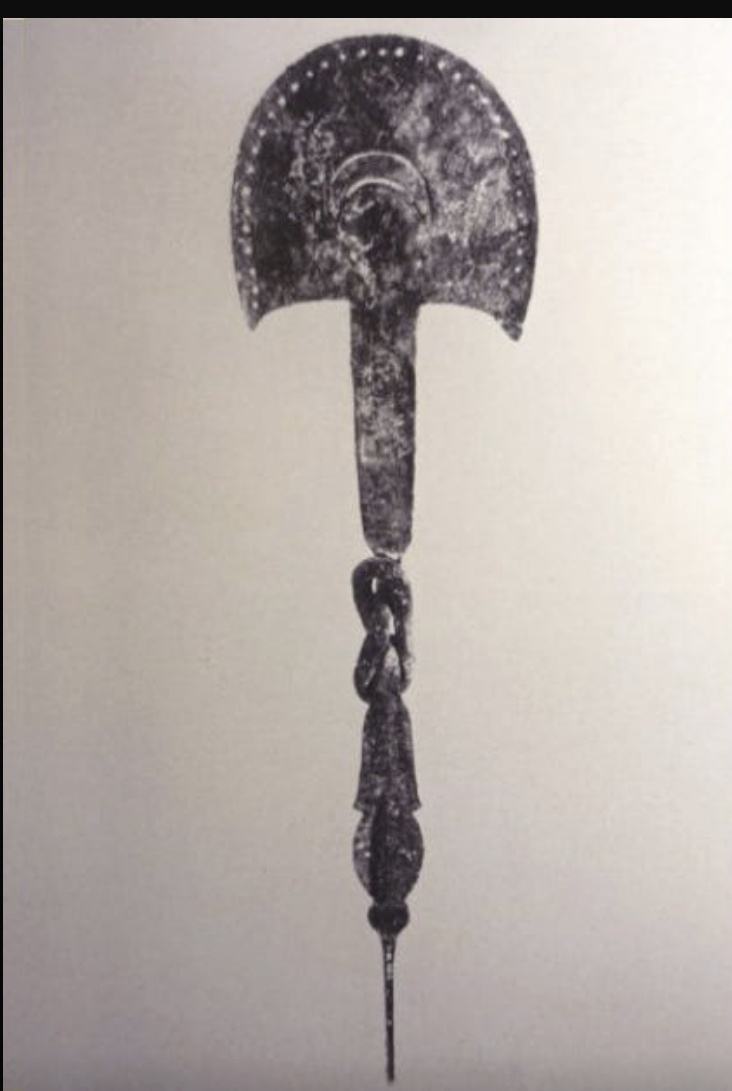
Igbo-Ukwu Copper Hand Fan (9th-11th century)

The Akupe (Igbo: àkùpè, (lit. 'fan') is a traditional Igbo hand fan. Hand fans dated to the 9th-11th centuries was unearthed in Igbo-Ukwu. At the Igbo Richard site, the head of a fan-holder was unearthed with beads over the fan holder. The fan was described to be part of the ceremonial regalia of the remains of the titled man buried at the site where the traditional copper fan was unearthed. According to Shaw, the fan together with other objects are similar to other staffs indicative of political-ritual-social status of individuals still to be found in the Igbo area. Modern Igbo hand fans are associated with marriages, high social status, or chieftancy.

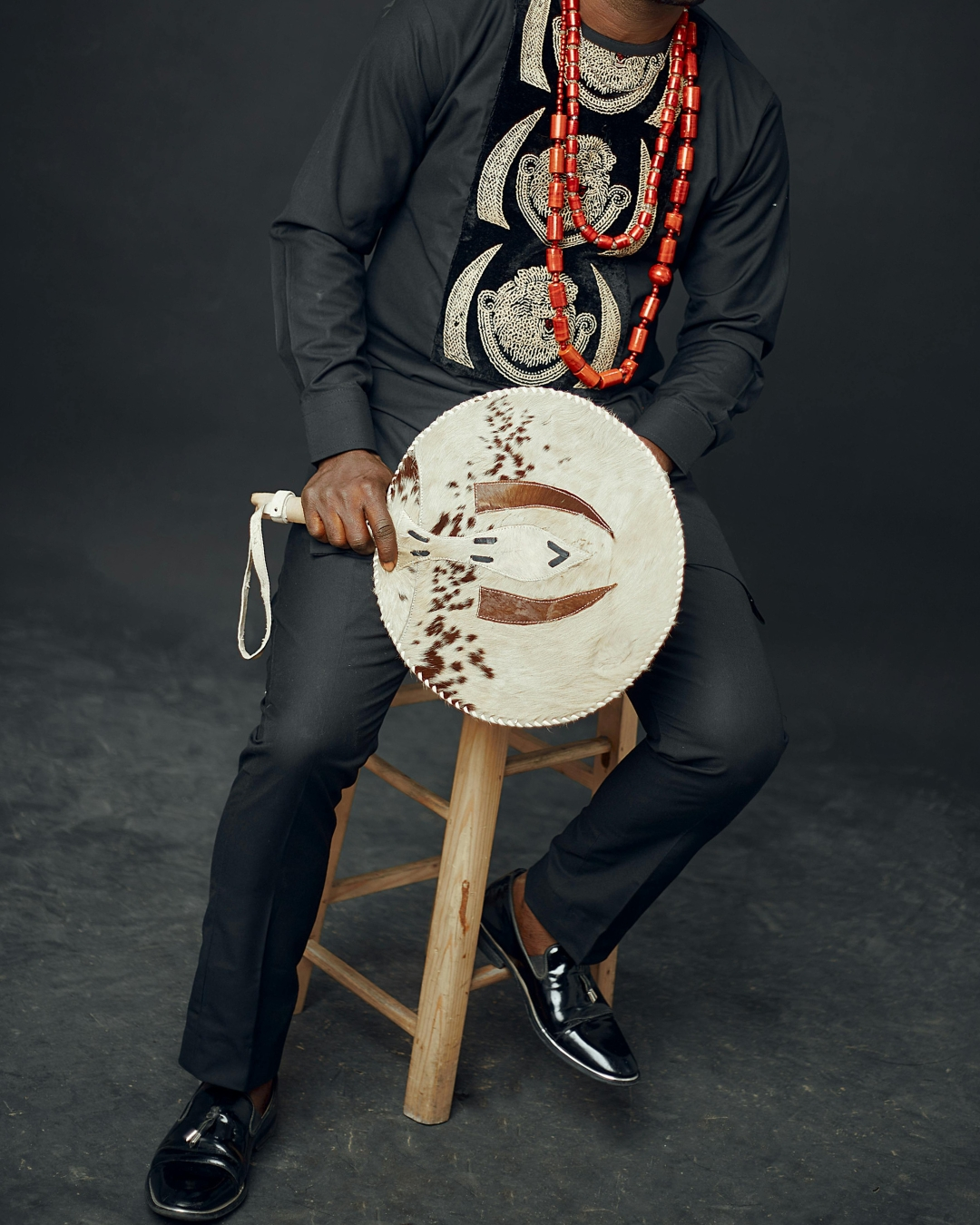
akupe

Modern Akupe are usually made of leather. And decorative textiles, feathers and other accessories for the females for ceremonial uses. Akupe are mostly used in ceremonies, chieftancies, weddings, and special events. The akupe represents honor, authority, prestige, an pride in one's heritage, often carried by chiefs, elders and grooms during important ceremonies.

== Akupe: use and symbolism in Igbo culture ==
The Akupe serves as both a ceremonial insignia and an element of elite male in Igbo Society. It is part of the regalia of titled men like the Ozo title holders, chiefs. and elders. Typically carried at the hand, it complements other symbols of status such as the Okpu, nkpara, nza or odu enyi and the traditional flowing shirt known as Isiagu, Akwete or Akwa ocha. Although is made of various materials, the titled men specifically use raw leather made handfans which is either called Akupe or agu Other names generally used to refer to the ceremonial fan is nkuku and nzuzu especially among the Agbalanze titled group of Onitsha. The Akupe is designed and decorated in various ways but particularly in a thick and heavy pattern for the titled men. Their titles or names are written or carved at the surface of the handfans while their vehicle plate numbers are also designed as such for identification. Akupe can be seen in Davido’s music video, where he is presented as an Igbo king holding an Akupe marked “001” He is also shown wearing a red cap and traditional Igbo clothing and sitting on a throne. The use of the Akupe in this scene shows its connection with traditional titles and authority in Igbo culture.

The fan is not merely acquired by titled men but bestowed on them during the capping ceremony where candidates are installed as Nze no ozo title holders or red cap chiefs. The final stage of the ceremony involves handing the candidate the Okpu nze na ozo and the Ugo feather, a fan and a sword among other insignia.

Akupe also serves as a ritual symbol in the Igbo mmanwu (masquerade) tradition, particularly in the cultural ceremony known as the Ijele dance where a significant personality among the dance group is known as Akupe carrier. While he is not a masquerade, he plays the prominent role of leading the Ijele with its symbolic powerful Akupe. The disappearance of either the Akupe or its bearer is believed to place the Ijele at risk. The Akupe bearer determines the movement of the Ijele, which moves or remains stationary according to the bearer's actions

== Akupe in Women's Ceremonies and Bridal Practices ==
The Akupe is traditionally associated with both men's and women's ceremonial practices in Igbo culture. Among women it features prominently in traditional marriage ceremonies (Igbankwu) and bridal processions where it is carried by the brides known as Nkpu girls and her maids of honour as a ceremonial emblem and a practical accessory. It is known as bridal hand fans in English. As early as 1920, Basden recorded the use of fans as an Igbo bridal custom where Igbo brides(Nkpu girls) were accompanied by maids of honour carrying "large fans wherewith to refresh their ladies after the bouts of dancing." The fans were carried to cool and refresh the bride during dances in the wedding processions.

In Igbo dances and performance traditions, artistic hand-held fans are used for aesthetics and symbolic purposes where they form part of the ceremonial ensemble

== See also ==
- Igbo regalia and headdresses
- Okpu Ozo
- Isiagu

== Gallery ==
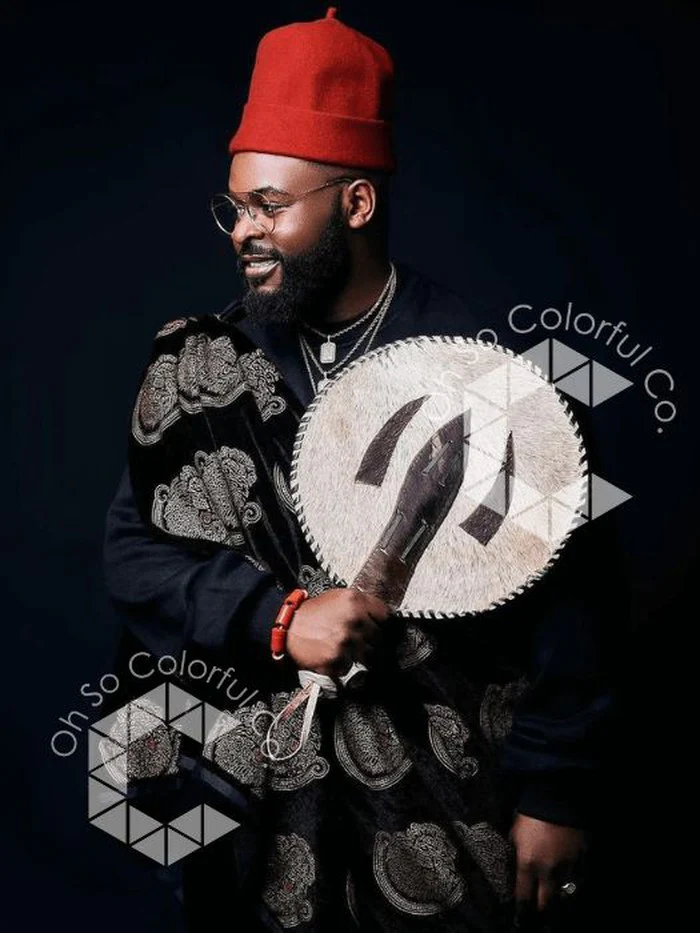
Man with Akupe

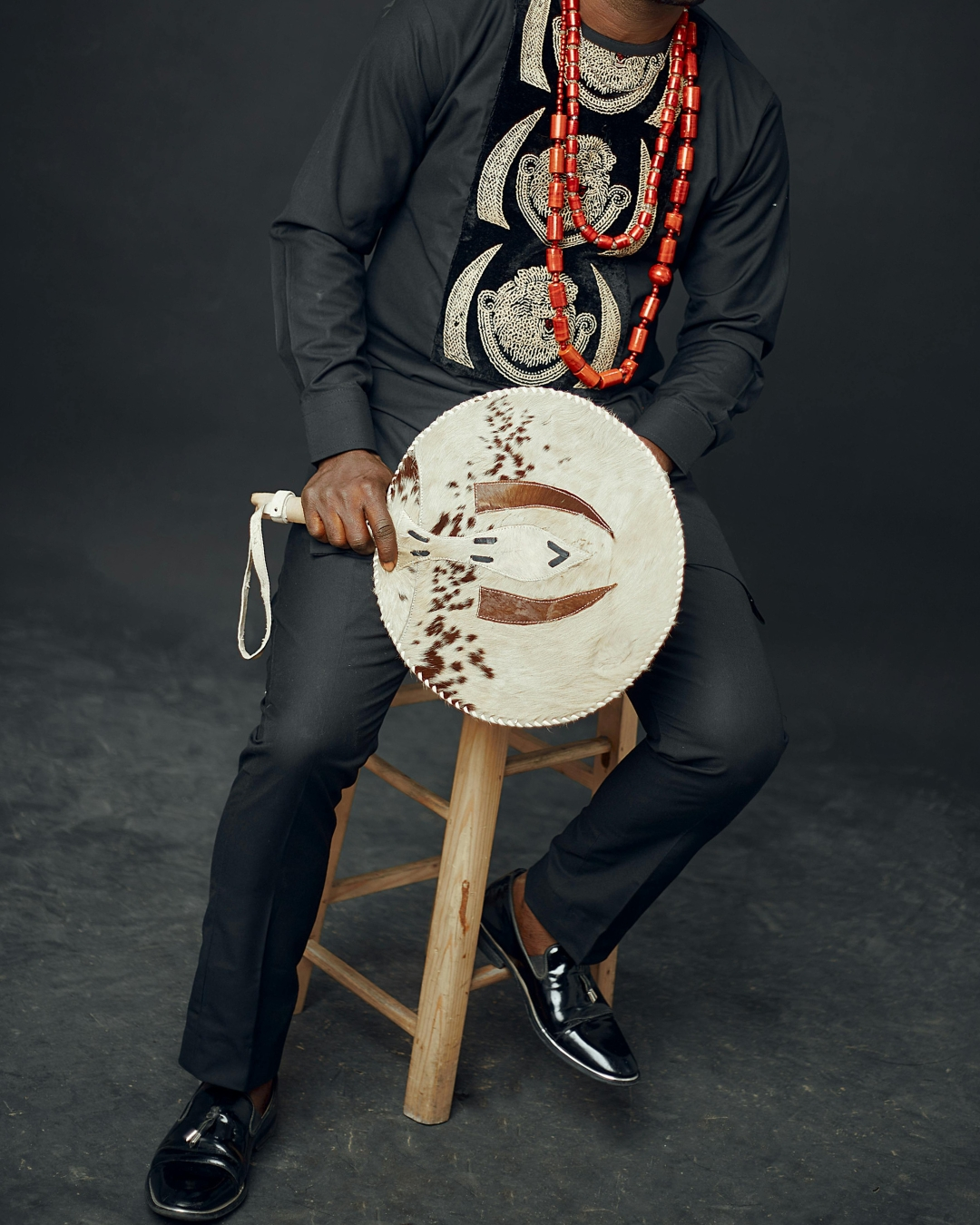
Man with Akupe

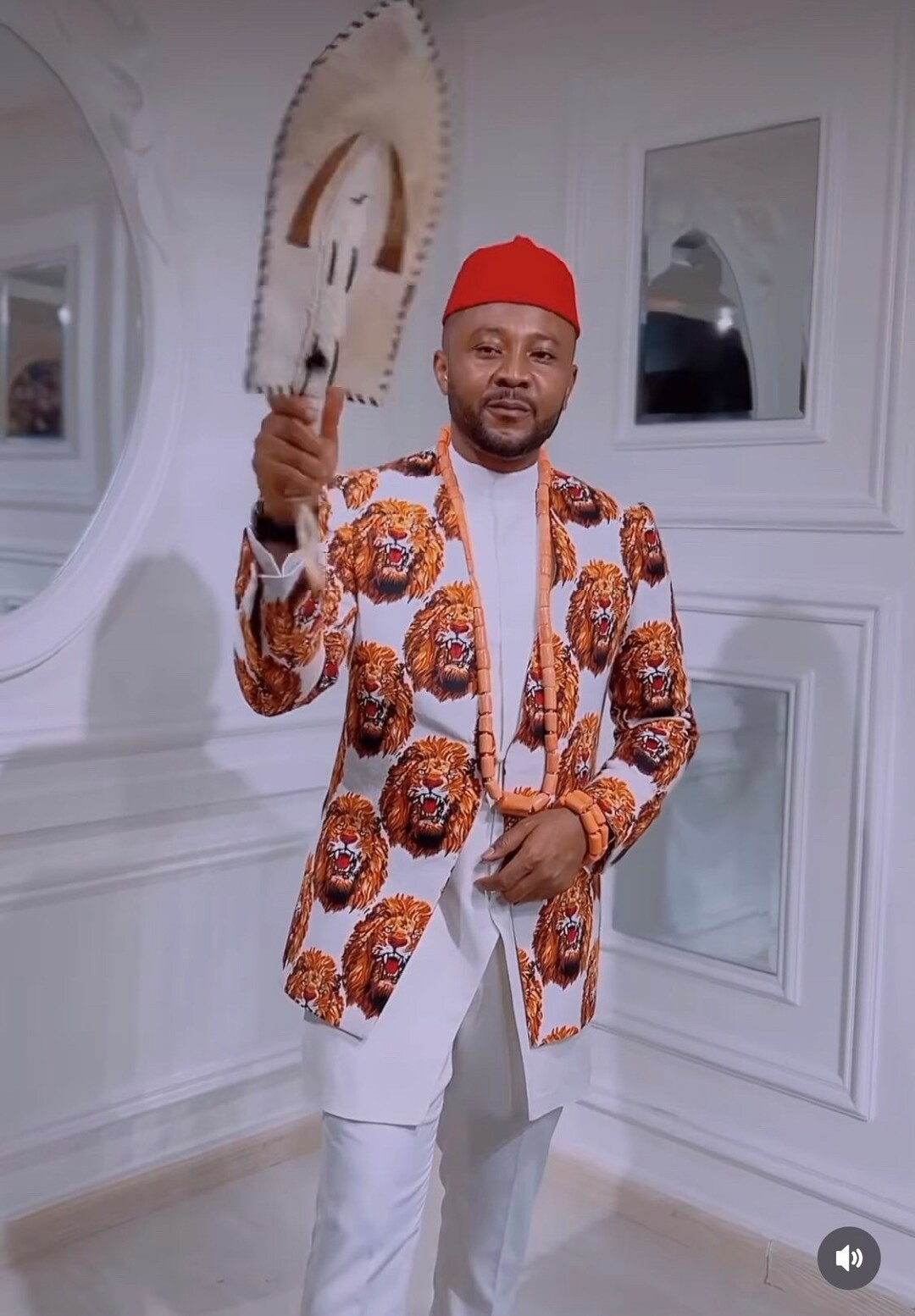
Man with Akupe

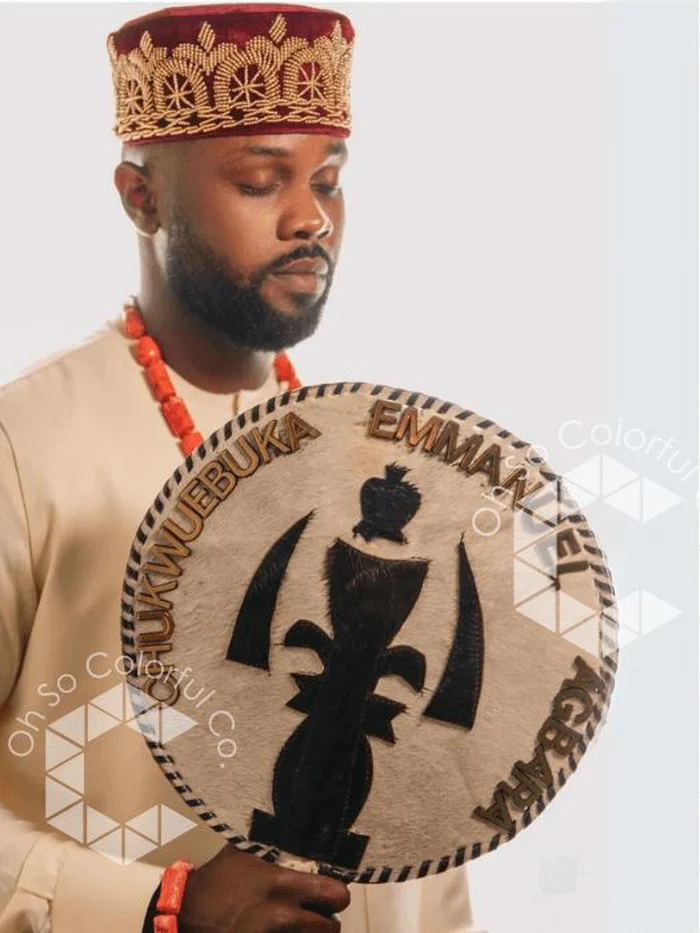
Akupe (handfan)

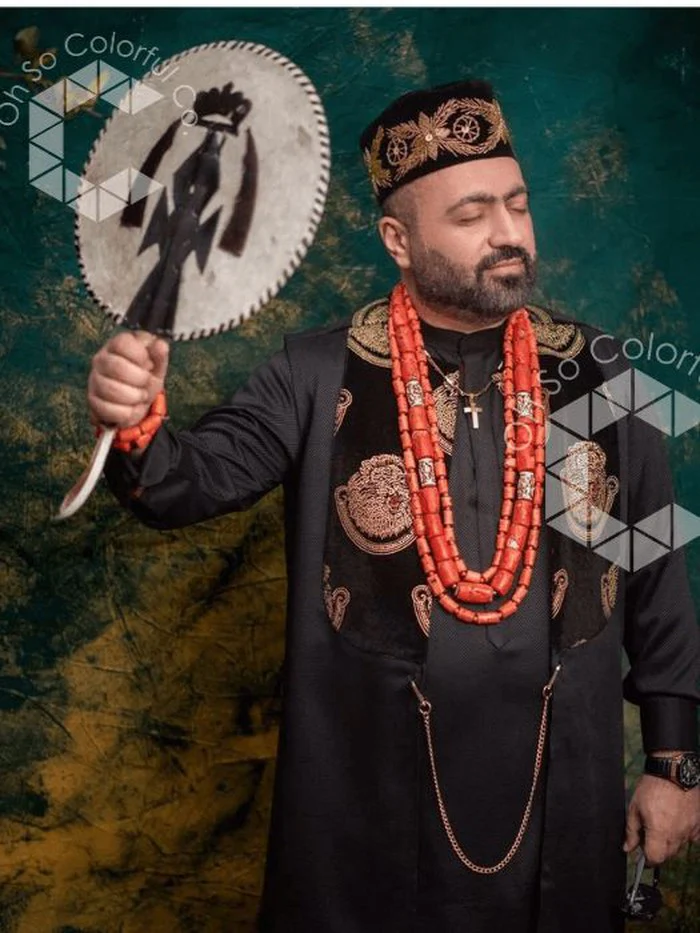
Akupe (handfan)

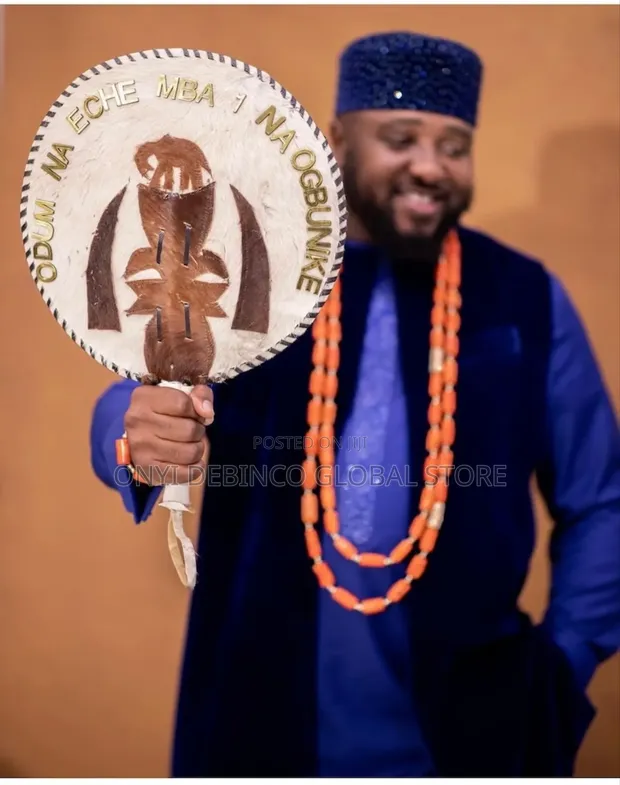
Akupe (handfan)

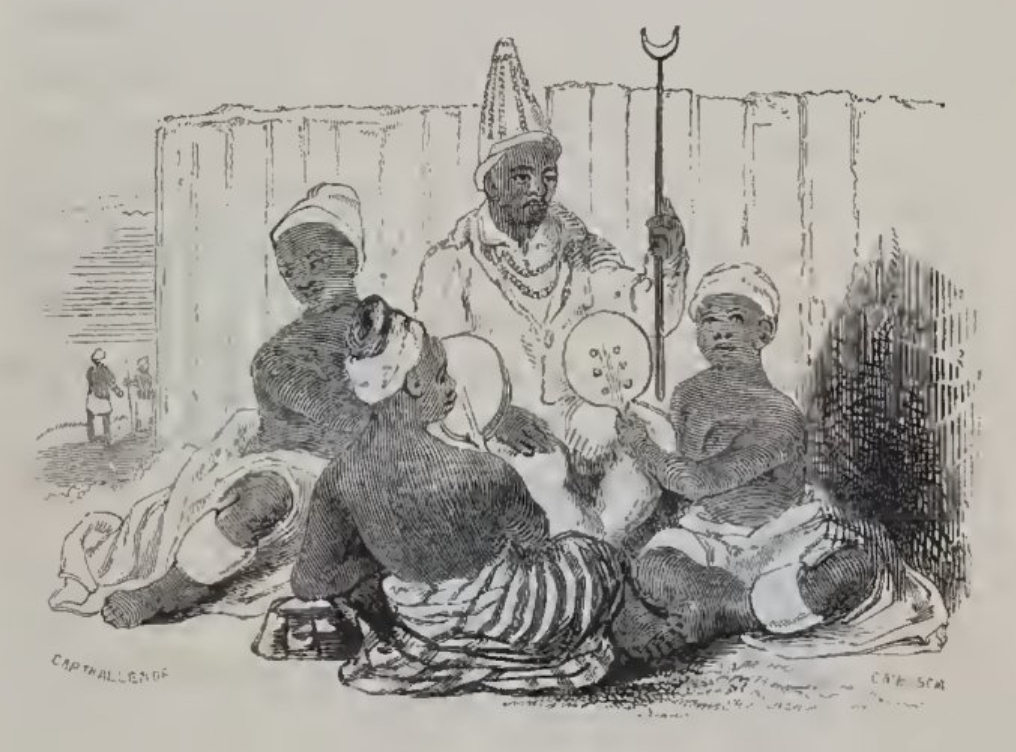
Obi Ossai King of Aboh wives, Odu women holding Akupe (hand fans) c. 1841

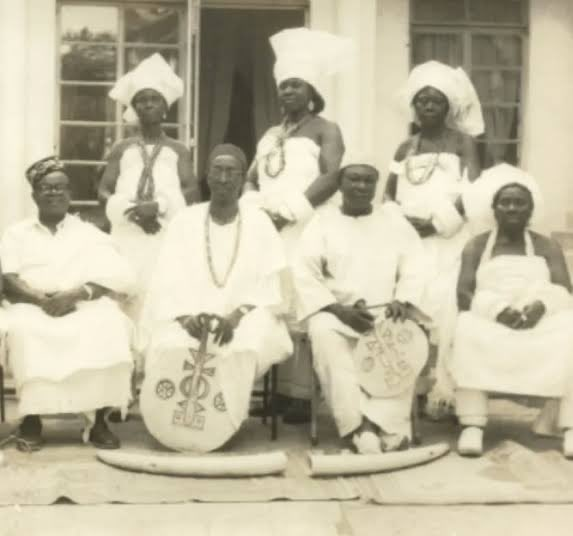
Obi of Onitsha with Otu Odu women in traditional ichafu attire

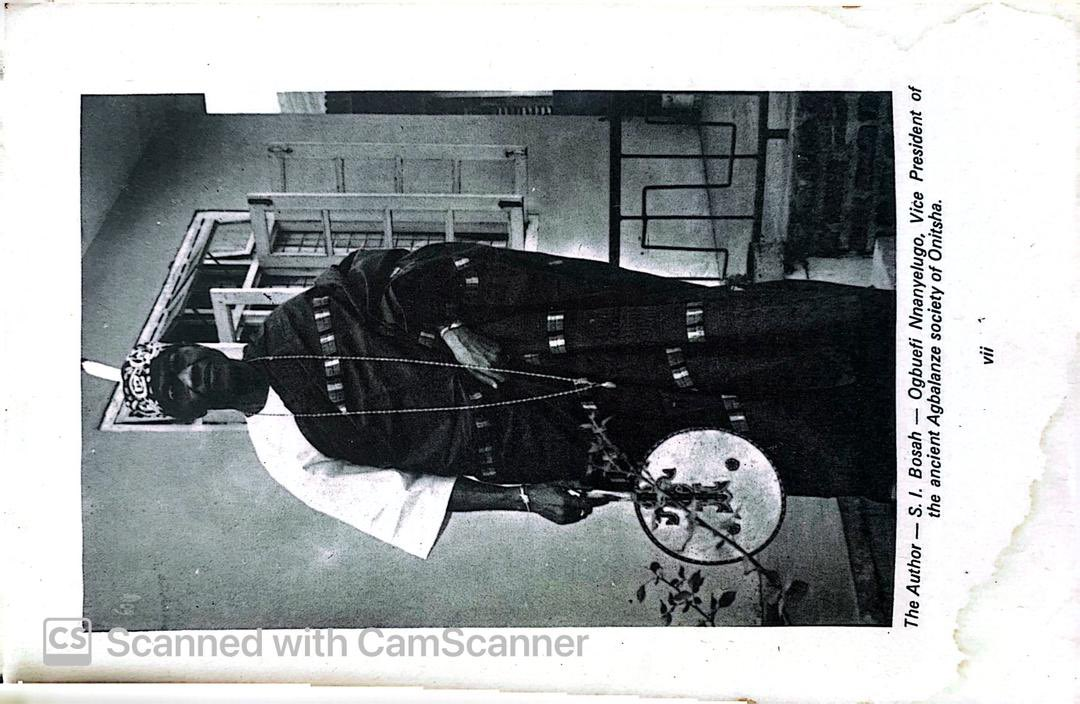
S.I. Bosah with Akupe (hand fan)

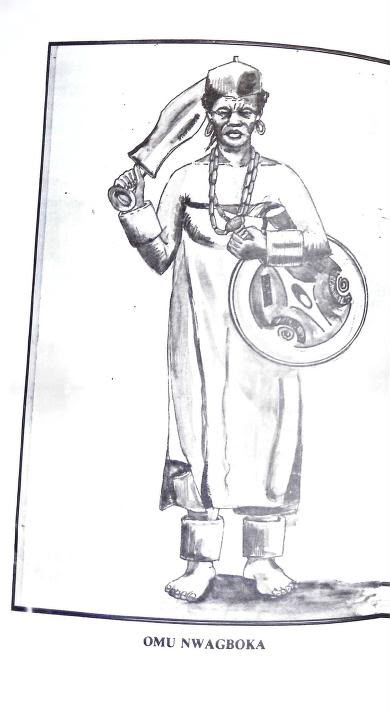
Omu Nwagboka reigned as the Omu of Onitsha from 1884

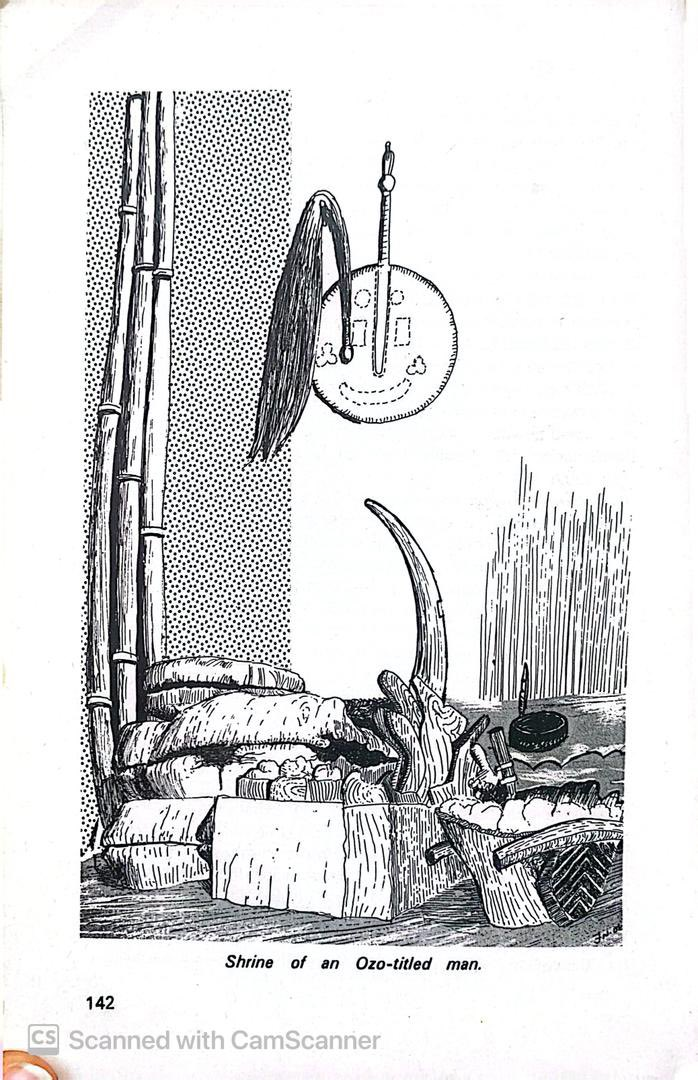
Shrine of an ozo titled man which consists of the akupe insignia

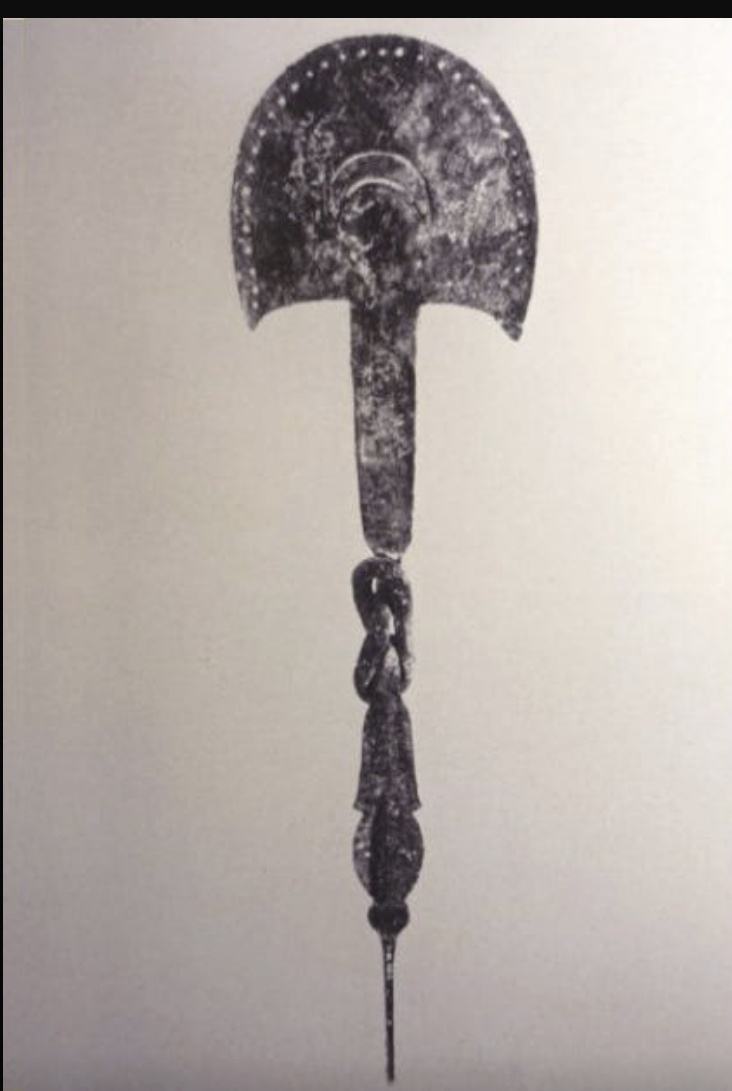
Igbo-Ukwu Copper Hand Fan

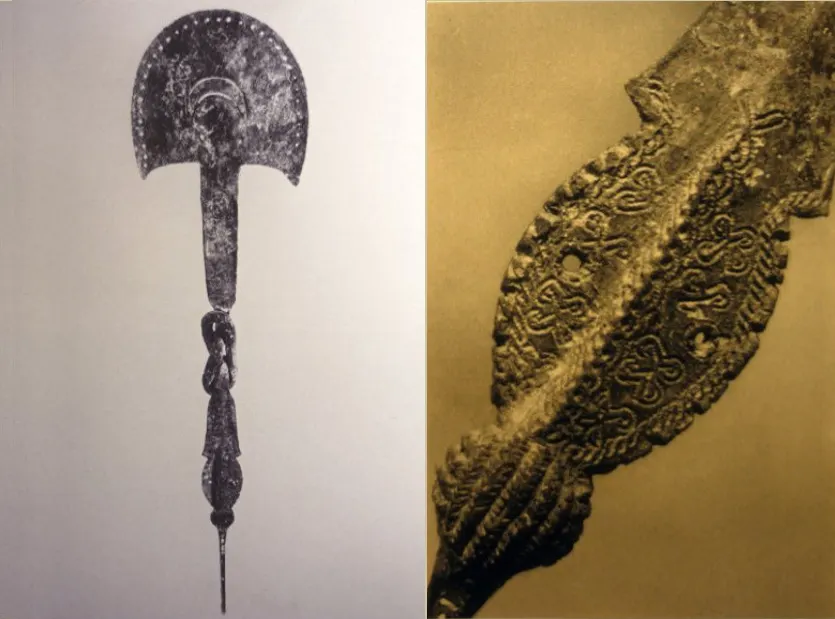
Igbo Ukwu copper fan with base
