= Lefe =

Marriage tradition of the Hausa people

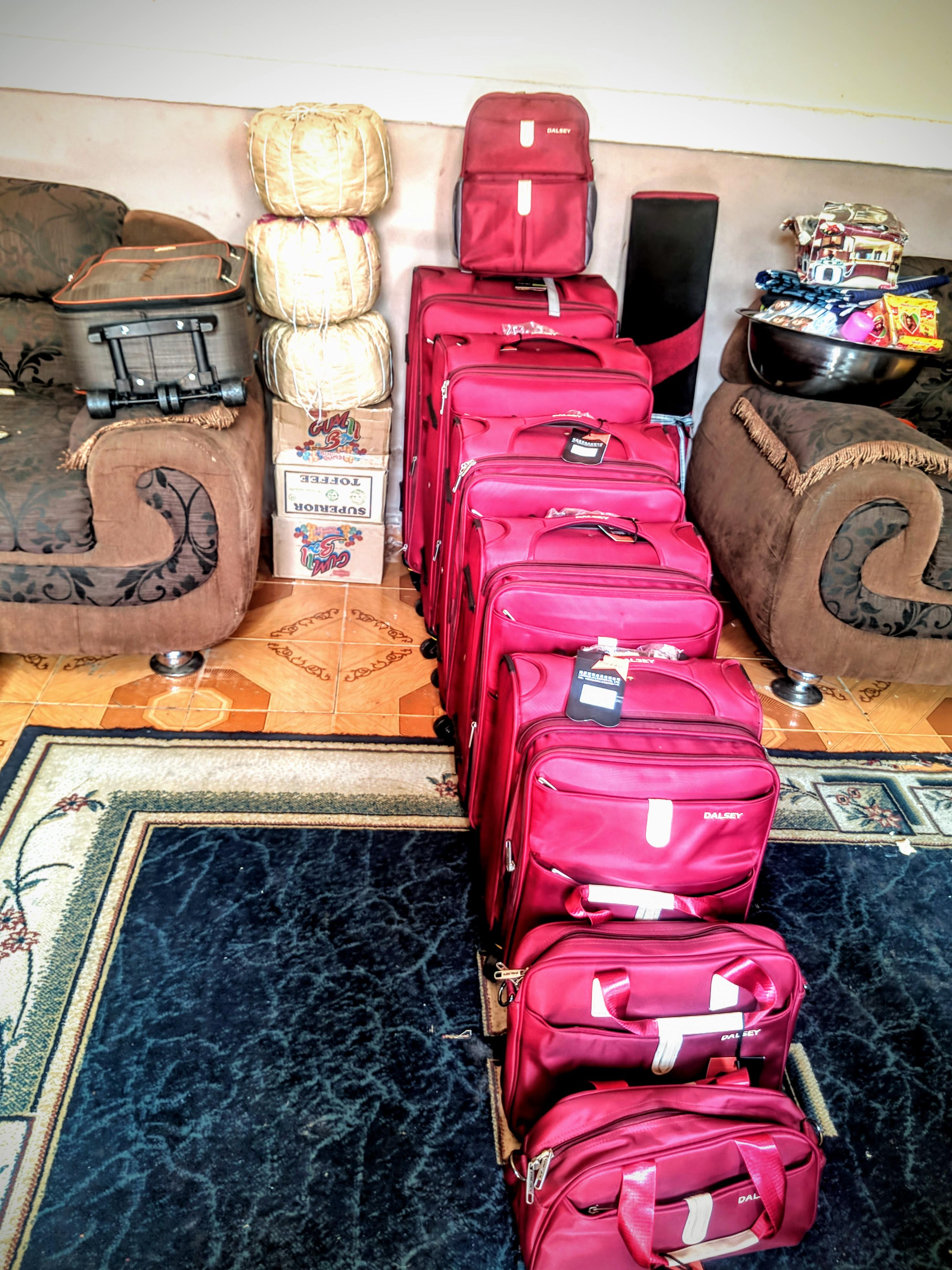
Lefe presented in suitcases

Lefe is a Hausa wedding tradition that originated in the Hausa Land, Northern Nigeria (Arewa). The tradition asks the groom to purchase beautiful and expensive items as a grand gift for his bride. The groom's female relatives, including his aunts, take the gifts (kayan lefe) to the bride's house before the wedding. Upon arrival, the bride's parents welcome them and offer refreshments, along with a small reward.

Lefe holds immense importance in Hausa weddings today. In fact, out of a hundred weddings conducted in Hausa culture, it is observed that 99.99% of Hausas follow the tradition of bringing lefe either before the wedding or on the wedding day. The tradition, which is embraced by other ethnic groups in Northern Nigeria. Additionally, in some groups it is expected that lefe will be given not only to the bride, but also to her female relatives.

== History ==
Lefe, which literally means "basket", was originally a woven bag made with kaba. This type of bag was used in Hausa communities to store wedding items sent to the bride's parents' house, then panteka. Later on, long boxes called kwalla became more popular. These were then replaced by wooden boxes called pantimoti, and then by another type of container called kumbo. And currently now suitcases.

== Lefe ==
The primary reasons for the presentation of lefe is to honor the bride and show the groom's ability to provide for her. Men may either purchase items themselves, or give a certain amount of money to their bride to spend as they wish, to ensure that the lefe are to the bride's taste. Since it is said that the bride is new, then the lefe given to the bride should also be new.

Traditional gifts include gold, head wraps, lace, and brocade. Cosmetics, jewelry, clothing, hand bags and shoes may also be given. Modern gifts, such as cars, can also be included in lefe.

== Akwati ==
Akwati are the containers, boxes, or suitcases used to store and transport Kayan lefe to the bride's house. The number of Akwati required may vary depending on the bridegroom's family background. These containers serve the purpose of securely holding and transporting the Kayan lefe, ensuring its safe arrival at the bride's house. Traditionally, two akwati were given to the bride's family. In the modern day, a set of six suitcases, called Akwatin aure, is the most popular choice.

In recent times, some Hausa people have opted to use refrigerators instead of boxes or suit cases for storing Kayan lefe. This shift is primarily driven by the recognition that refrigerators offer greater utility compared to a set of boxes.

== Criticism ==
The cultural practice has been criticized for hindering the marriage prospects of young individuals in northern Nigeria without many financial means. In the 2020s, some articles estimates that a middle-class man would spend between 1 and 3 million naira for lefe.

Lefe has also been criticized for centering material goods, rather than the compatibility of the couple.
