= Sohbet =

Sohbet, meaning "conversation", "discussion", "chat" in Turkish, may refer to:

- Traditional Sohbet meetings, a cultural tradition in Turkey
- The discussion at the closing of the Jem Alevi ceremony
- An address of a Sufi leader to the community; see Sufi Center Rabbaniyya § Sohbet

== See also ==
- Söhbətli
