= List of Intangible Cultural Heritage elements in Turkey =

List of UNESCO intangible cultural heritages of Türkiye

The United Nations Educational, Scientific and Cultural Organisation (UNESCO) intangible cultural heritage elements are the non-physical traditions and practices performed by a people. As part of a country's cultural heritage, they include celebrations, festivals, performances, oral traditions, music, and the making of handicrafts. The "intangible cultural heritage" is defined by the Convention for the Safeguarding of Intangible Cultural Heritage, drafted in 2003 and took effect in 2006. Inscription of new heritage elements on the UNESCO Intangible Cultural Heritage Lists is determined by the Intergovernmental Committee for the Safeguarding of Intangible Cultural Heritage, an organisation established by the convention. Türkiye ratified the convention on 17 October 2003.

== Intangible Cultural Heritage of Humanity ==
+ Transnational element

=== Representative List ===
Name	Year	No.	Description
Arts of the Meddah, public storytellers	2008	00037	Meddahs tell educational and instructive stories in front of the community.
Mevlevi Sema ceremony	2008	00100	Sama (Turkish: Sema; Arabic, Lashkari and Persian: سَماع, romanized: samā‘^{un}) is a Sufi ceremony performed as part of the meditation and prayer practice dhikr.
Karagöz	2009	00180	Karagöz and Hacivat is a shadow play performed on a screen with two-dimensional depictions, based on imitation and mutual conversation.
Âşıklık (minstrelsy) tradition	2009	00179	An ashik (Azerbaijani: aşıq, عاشؽق; Turkish: âşık; Persian: عاشیق—all from Arabic: عاشِق) or ashugh (Armenian: աշուղ; Georgian: აშუღი) is traditionally a singer-poet and bard.
Traditional Sohbet meetings	2010	00385	Traditional Chat Meetings is a Turkish social application of community chats. Communities consist exclusively of men of a certain age (commonly 15 or 16), regardless of ethnicity, religion or status.
Kırkpınar oil wrestling festival	2010	00386	Kırkpınar Oil Wrestling, traditional Turkish oil wrestling tournament. It is held in Edirne every year between the end of June and the beginning of July.
Semah, Alevi-Bektaşi ritual	2010	00384	Semah is a ceremonial Tarîkat Rite that is common in Alevi and Bektashi communities and is performed with musical accompaniment in Cemevi.
Ceremonial Keşkek tradition	2011	00388	Ceremonial keskek is a traditional dish consisting mainly of cracked wheat and meat, which varies according to the regions of Anatolia and is generally made during weddings and holidays.
Mesir Macunu festival	2012	00642	Mesir paste is a type of paste consisting of 41 types of spices and herbs believed to be medicinal.
Turkish coffee culture and tradition	2013	00645	Turkish coffee is one of the oldest known coffee preparation and cooking methods, from the Ottoman Empire to the beginning, which has an important place in Turkish history.
Ebru, Turkish art of marbling	2014	00644	Marbling is a decorative art made by transferring patterns created with specially prepared dyes on water, concentrated with tragacanth, onto paper.
Nawrouz, Novruz, Nowrouz, Nowrouz, Nawrouz, Nauryz, Nooruz, Nowruz, Navruz, Nevruz, Nowruz, Navruz + (Note: Shared with Afghanistan, Azerbaijan, India, Iran, Iraq, Kazakhstan, Kyrgyzstan, Uzbekistan, Mongolia, Pakistan, Tajikistan, and Turkmenistan.)	2016	02097	Nevruz Festival, or simply Nevruz, is the traditional new year or the awakening of nature and spring festival celebrated by various peoples around the world.
Flatbread making and sharing culture: Lavash, Katyrma, Jupka, Yufka + (Note: Shared with Azerbaijan, Iran, Kazakhstan, and Kyrgyzstan.)	2016	01181	Yufka or sheet bread is obtained by lightly baking the phyllo dough used in making baklava and pastries until it becomes crispy on the sheet.
Traditional craftsmanship of Çini-making	2016	01058	Tile is a glazed, waterproof layer on one side or a plate resulting from the fusion of glass and ceramics by fire.
Iftar/Eftari/Iftar/Iftor and its socio-cultural traditions + (Note: Shared with Azerbaijan, Iran and Uzbekistan.)	2017	01984	Iftar is the meal eaten after the evening call to prayer (at sunset) at the end of the fasting day of Muslims in Ramadan.
Spring celebration, Hıdrellez + (Note: Shared with North Macedonia.)	2017	01284	Hıdırellez or Hıdrellez is one of the seasonal holidays celebrated in Central Asia, the Middle East, Anatolia and the Balkans.
Heritage of Dede Qorqud/Korkyt Ata/Dede Korkut, epic culture, folk tales and music + (Note: Shared with Azerbaijan and Kazakhstan.)	2018	01399	The Book of Dede Korkut is the oldest known epic stories of the Oghuz Turks.
Traditional Turkish archery	2019	01367	Turkish archery, the importance of archery and especially horse archery in Turks dates back to prehistoric times.
Art of miniature + (Note: Shared with Azerbaijan, Iran, and Uzbekistan.)	2020	01598	Miniature is a type of painting that has its own unique form. Commonly, book illustrations that visualize the text in manuscript books, making the information contained in the text more clear, are known as miniatures..
Traditional intelligence and strategy game: Togyzqumalaq, Toguz Korgool, Mangala/Göçürme + (Note: Shared with Kazakhstan and Kyrgyzstan.)	2020	01597	Mangala, Köçürme, a Turkish intelligence game; It is commonly known as Mankala game in the world.
Hüsn-i Hat, traditional calligraphy in Islamic art in Turkey	2021	01684	Hüsn-i calligraphy is the art of beautiful writing formed around Arabic letters.
Telling tradition of Nasreddin Hodja/ Molla Nesreddin/ Molla Ependi/ Apendi/ Afendi Kozhanasyr Anecdotes + (Note: Shared with Azerbaijan, Kazakhstan, Kyrgyzstan, Tajikistan, Turkmenistan, and Uzbekistan.)	2022	01705	Nasreddin Hodja (Ottoman: نصر الدین خوجه; 1208, Hortu - 1284, Akşehir) is a legendary person and humor hero who lived around Hortu and Akşehir during the sultanate of Rum period.
Culture of Çay (tea), a symbol of identity, hospitality and social interaction + (Note: Shared with Azerbaijan.)	2022	01685	In Azerbaijan and Turkey, tea culture is an important social practice that shows hospitality, establishes and maintains social ties, and is used to celebrate important moments in the lives of societies.
Sericulture and traditional production of silk for weaving + (Note: Shared with Afghanistan, Azerbaijan, Iran, Tajikistan, Turkmenistan, and Uzbekistan.)	2022	01890	Sericulture or sericulture is the raising of silkworms to produce silk.
Craftsmanship and performing art of balaban/mey + (Note: Shared with Azerbaijan.)	2023	01704	Balaban or balaman is an instrument belonging to the wind instrument group used in many South Caucasus and Central Asian countries.
Art of illumination: Təzhib/Tazhib/Zarhalkori/Tezhip/Naqqoshlik + (Note: Shared with Azerbaijan, Iran, Tajikistan, and Uzbekistan.)	2023	01981	İllumination is the name given to book decoration arts, mostly of Islamic origin.
Craftsmanship of mother of pearl inlay + (Note: Shared with Azerbaijan.)	2023	01874	In the technique known as mother-of-pearl inlay, also known as mother-of-pearl crafting or mother-of-pearl processing, mother-of-pearl is placed in pits or carvings opened on the wood and adhesives are applied to prevent it from falling off the surface in contact with the wood, or mother-of-pearl is surrounded by metal wires.
Traditional bagpipe (Gayda/Tulum) making and performing + (Note: Shared with North Macedonia.)	2024	02114	Traditional way of creating the woodwind musical instrument, known as Tulum. The instrument is mostly used in the Eastern Black Sea region of Turkey.
Antep İşi, drawn thread embroidery of Gaziantep	2025	02294	Antep İşi is a centuries-old needlework technique.

=== Need of Urgent Protection ===
The List of Intangible Cultural Heritage in Need of Urgent Protection includes elements of intangible cultural heritage that "are of concern to communities and where 'State Parties' consider that urgent measures should be taken to preserve them."

Name	No.	Year
Whistled language	00658	2017
Traditional Ahlat stonework	00655	2022
Traditional knowledge, methods and practices concerning olive cultivation	01983	2023

== Gallery ==
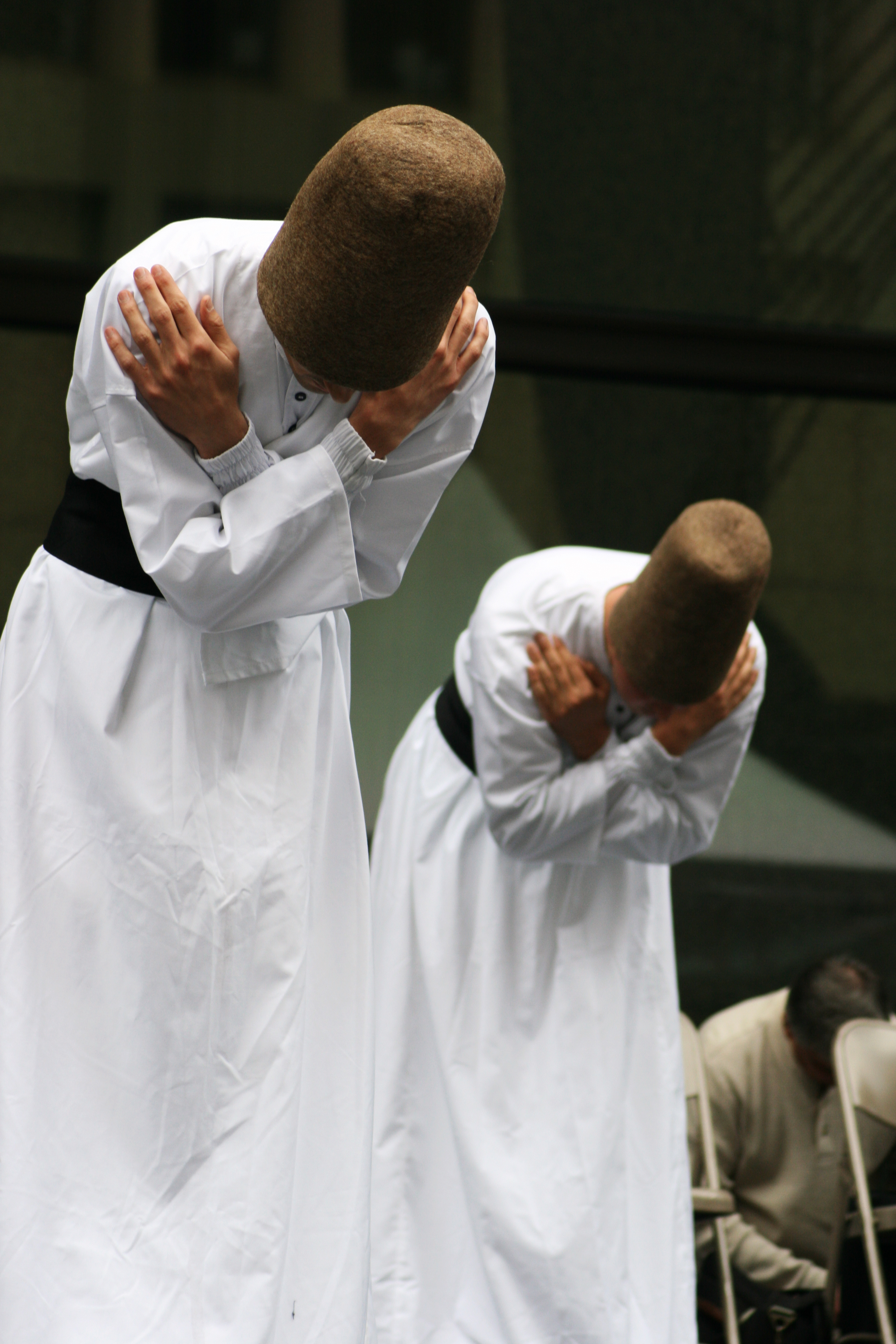
Whirling dervishes of Mevlevi Order

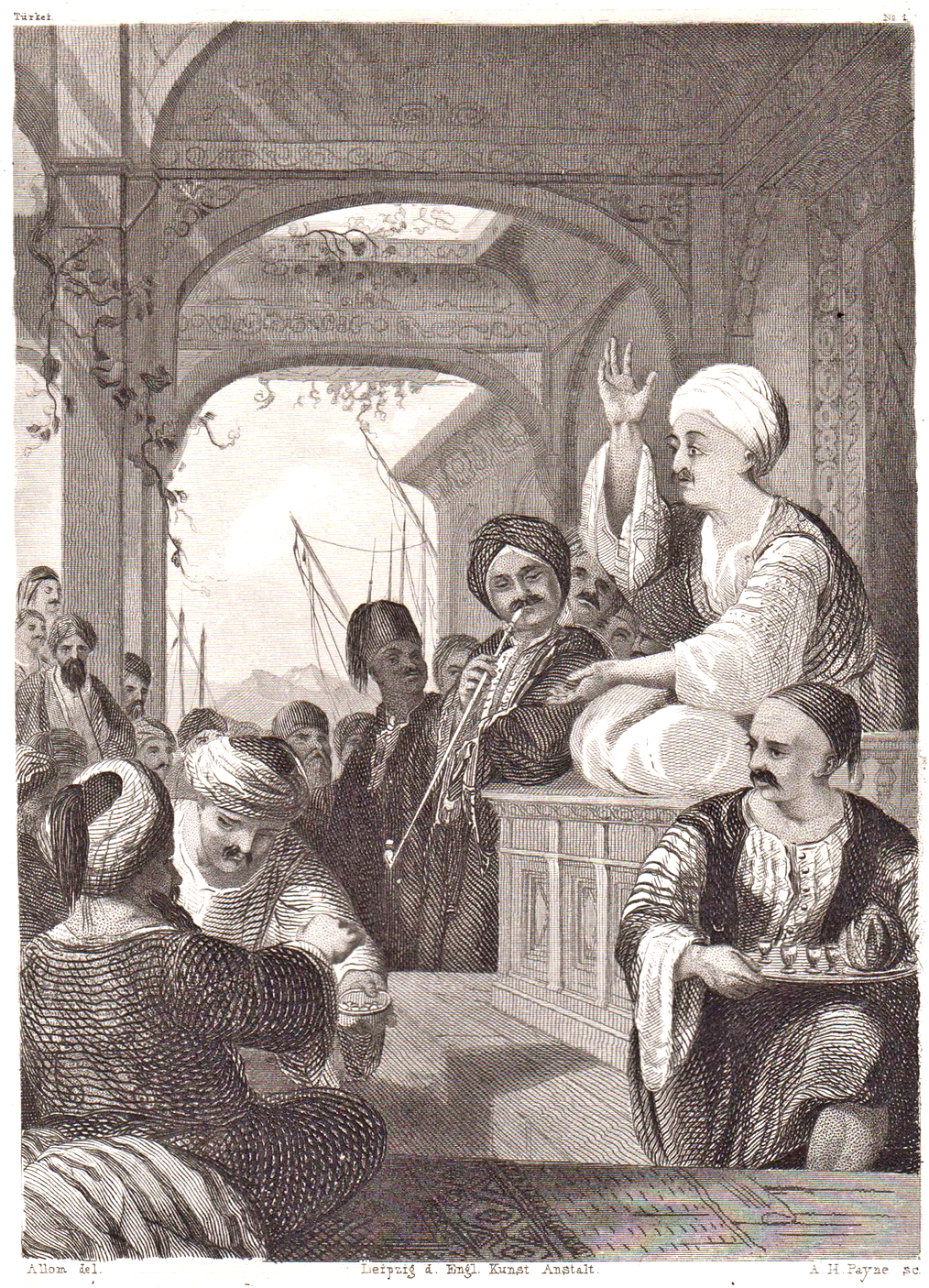
Meddah, story teller

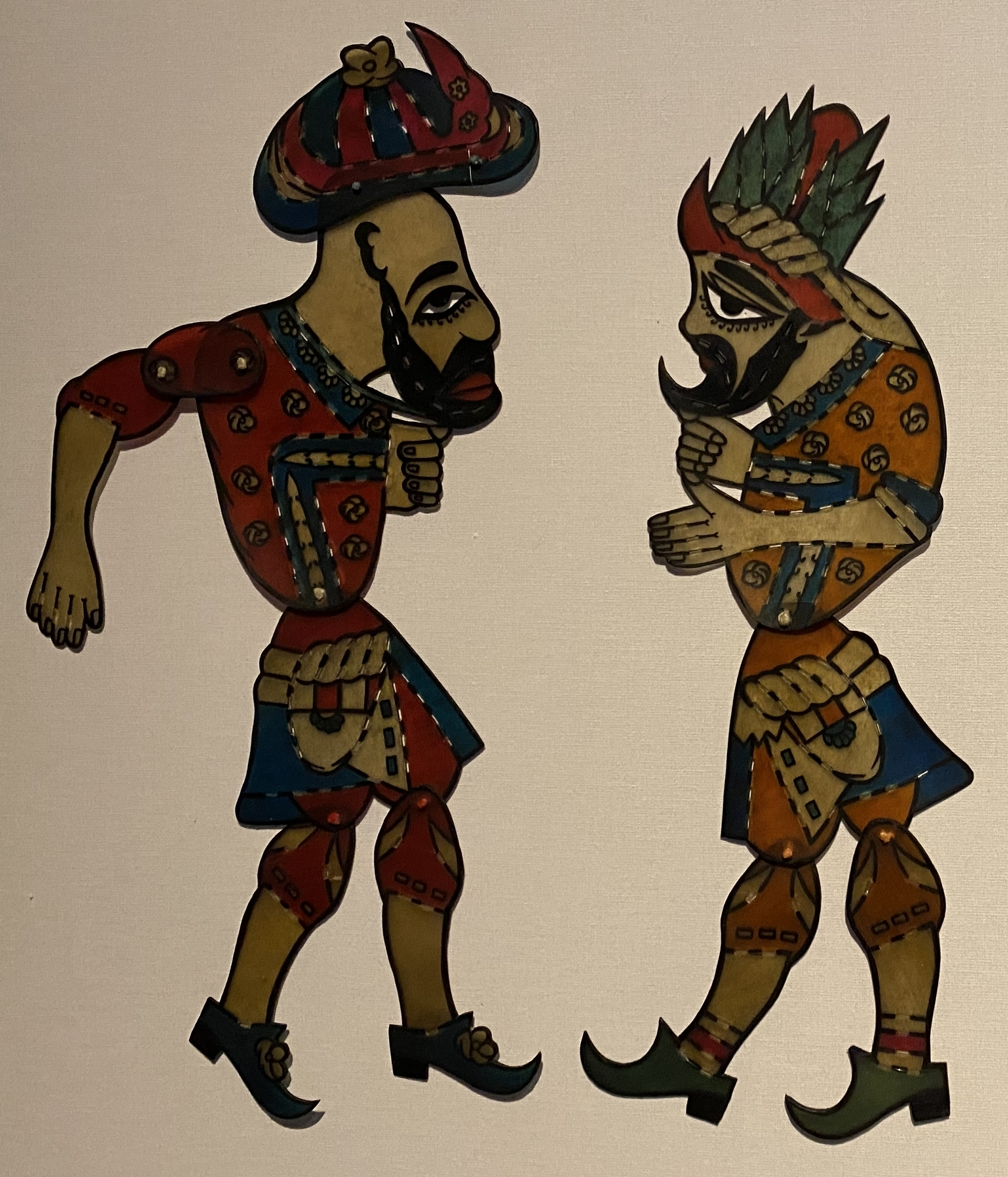
Karagöz, shadow play

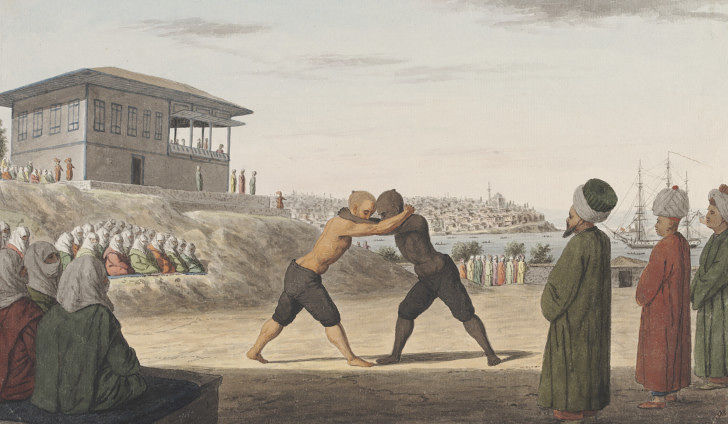
Oil wrestling

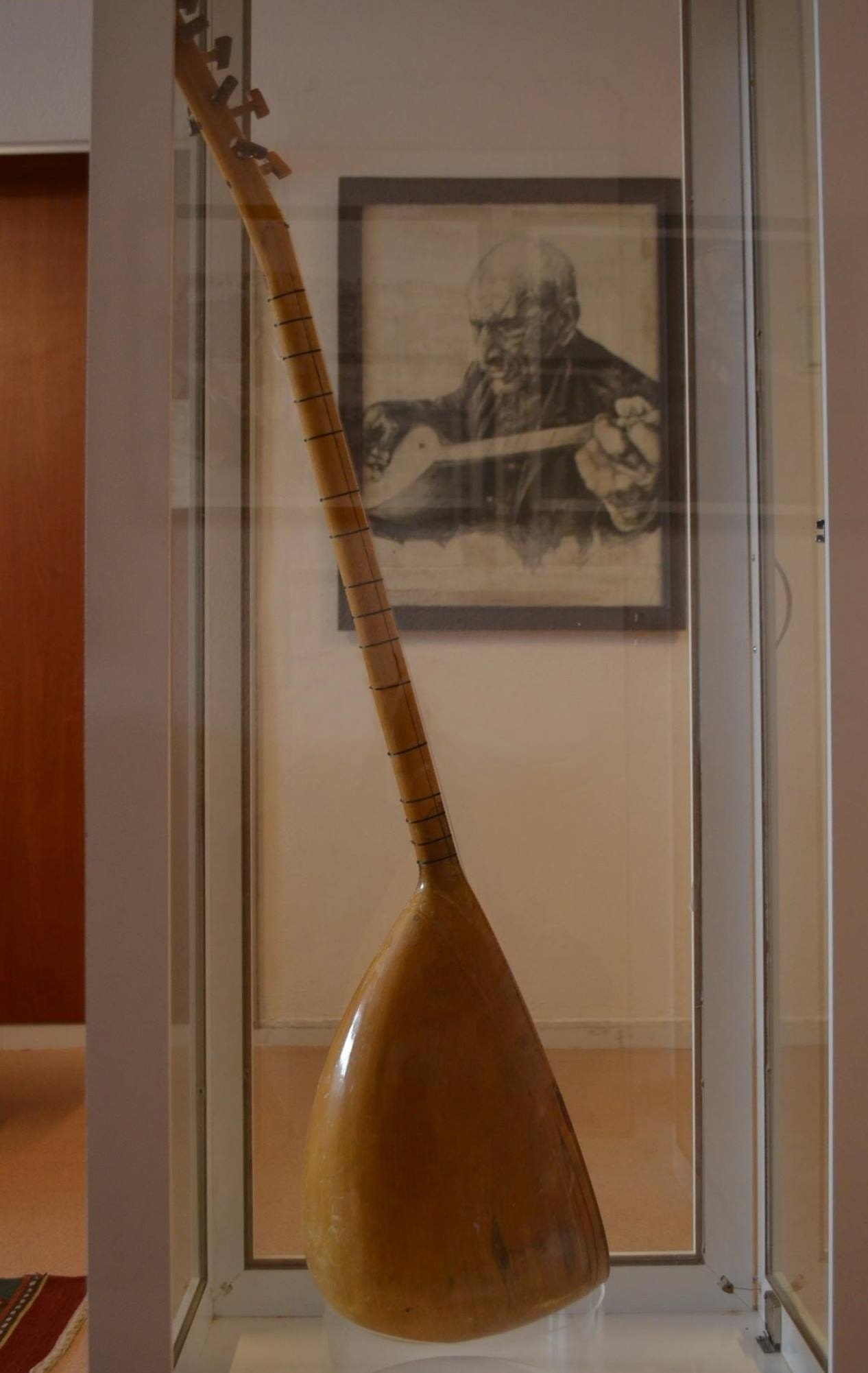
Bağlama belonging to Aşık Veysel

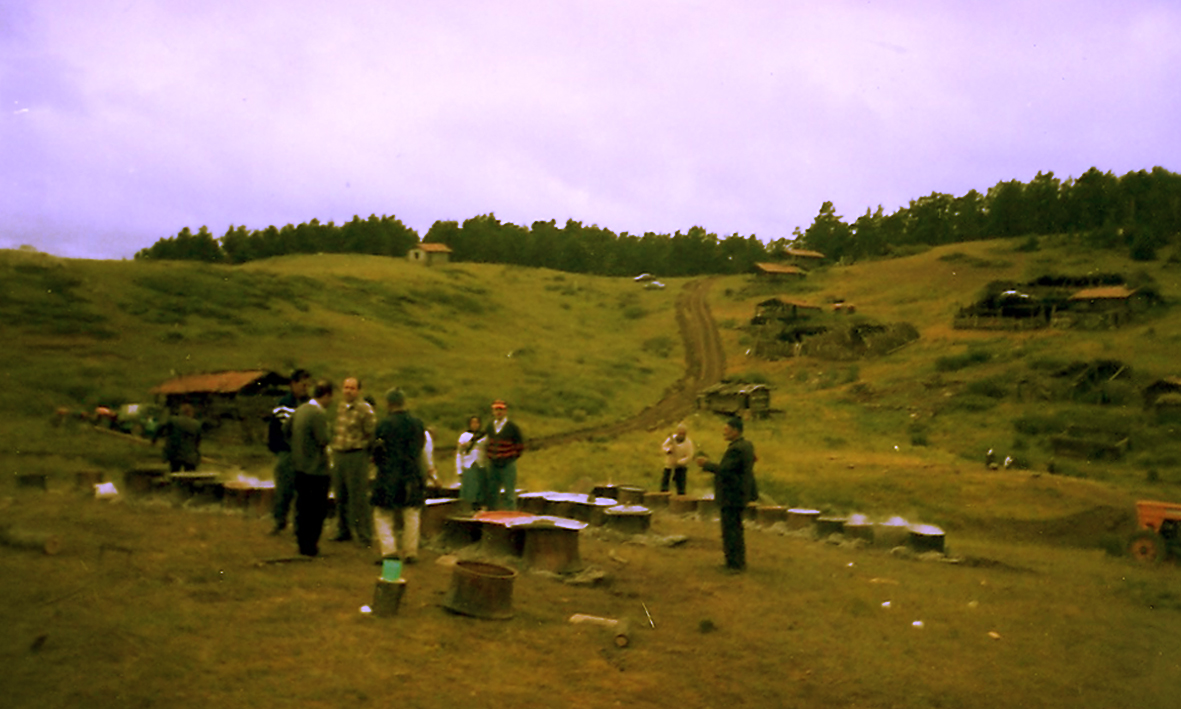
Making Keşkek in Akkaya

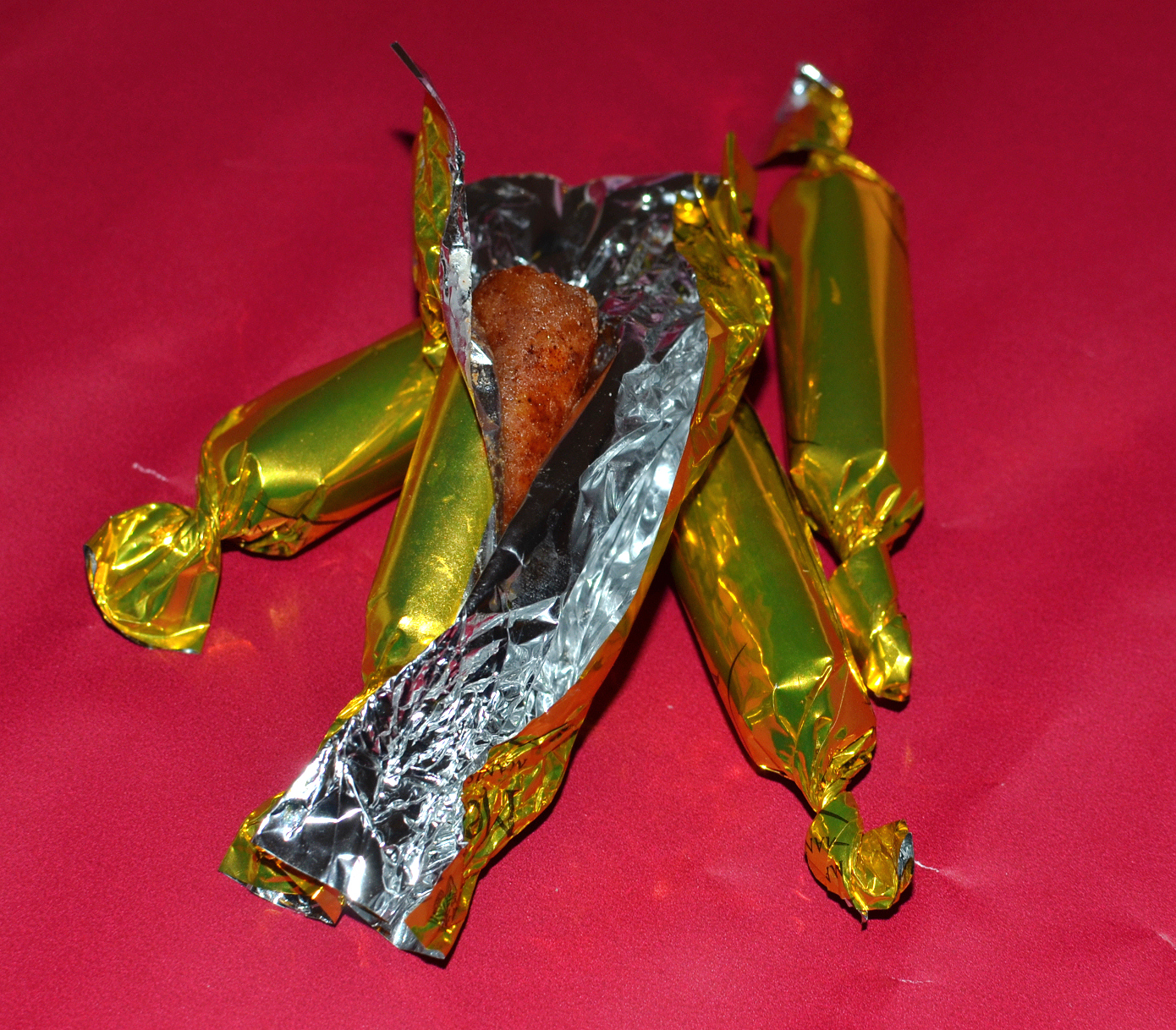
Mesir macunu, a traditional paste

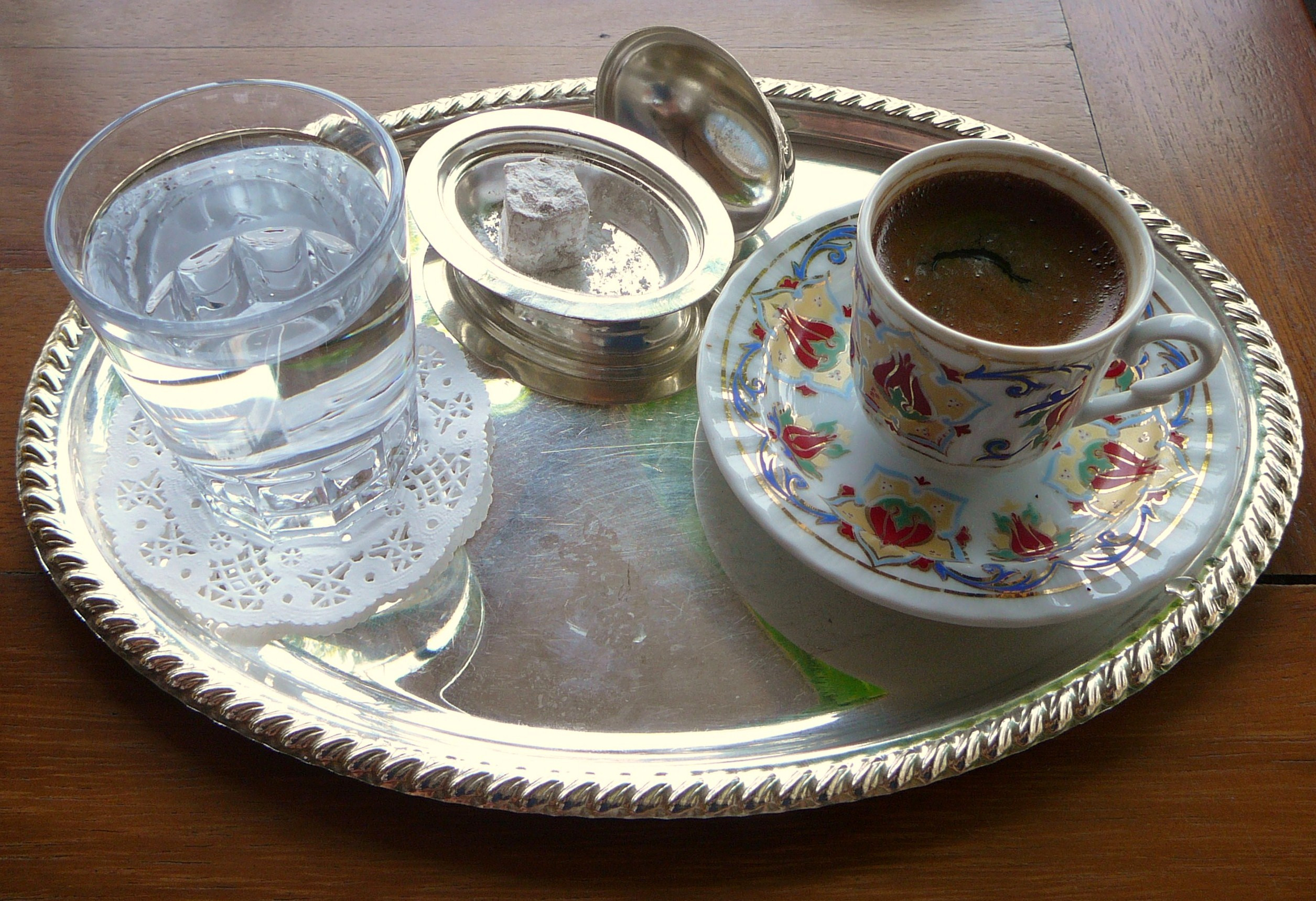
Traditional Turkish coffee

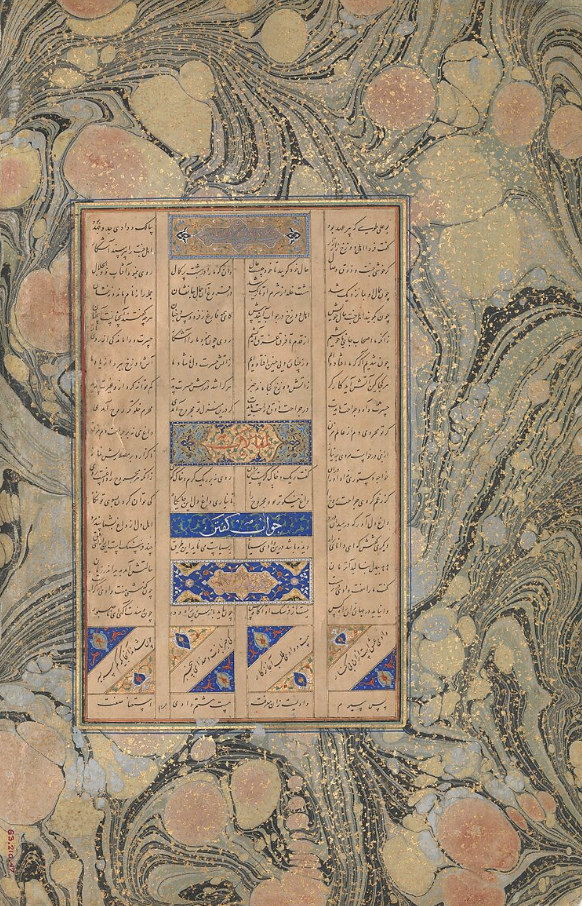
Ebru, water marbling

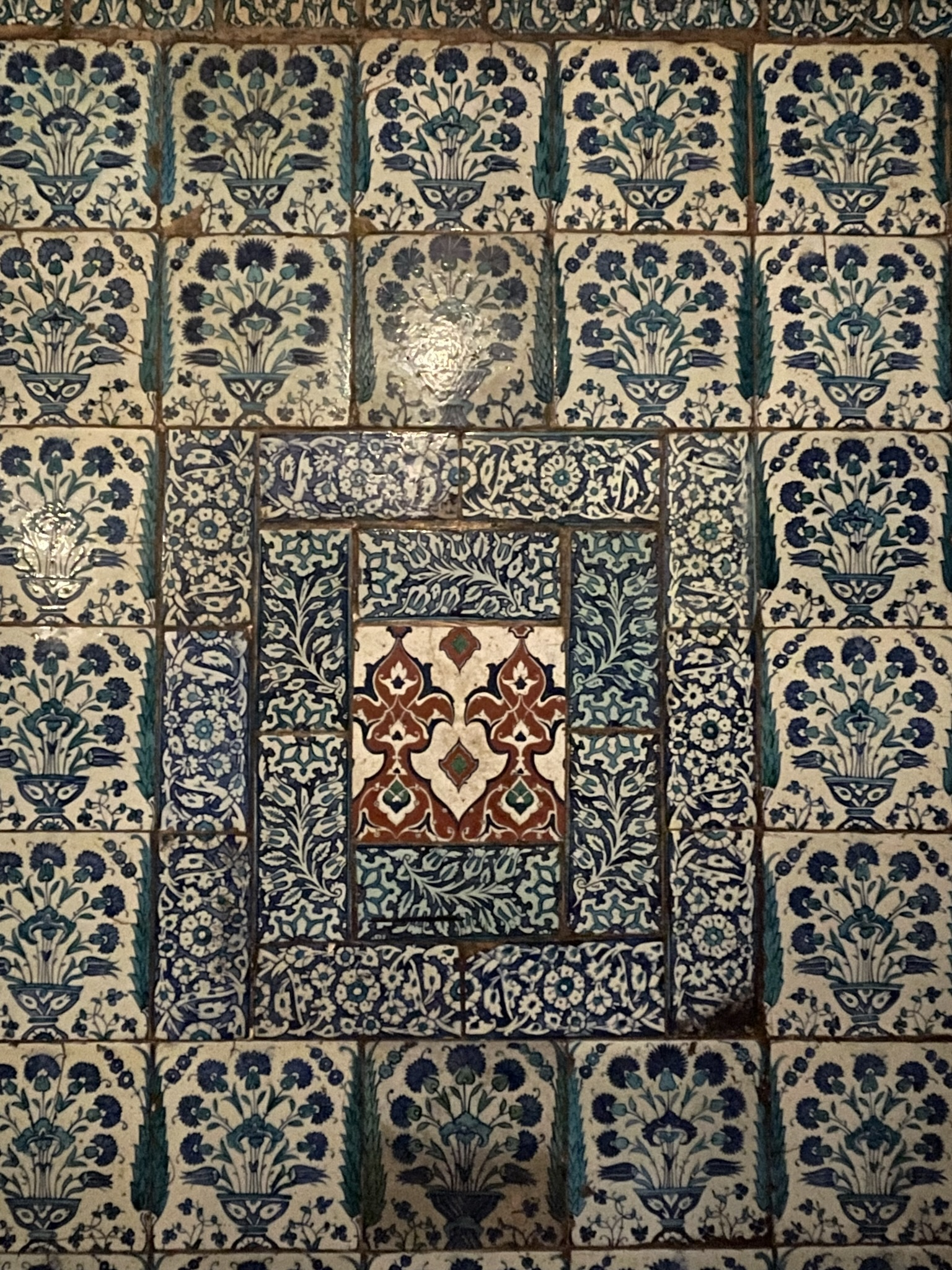
Iznik pottery

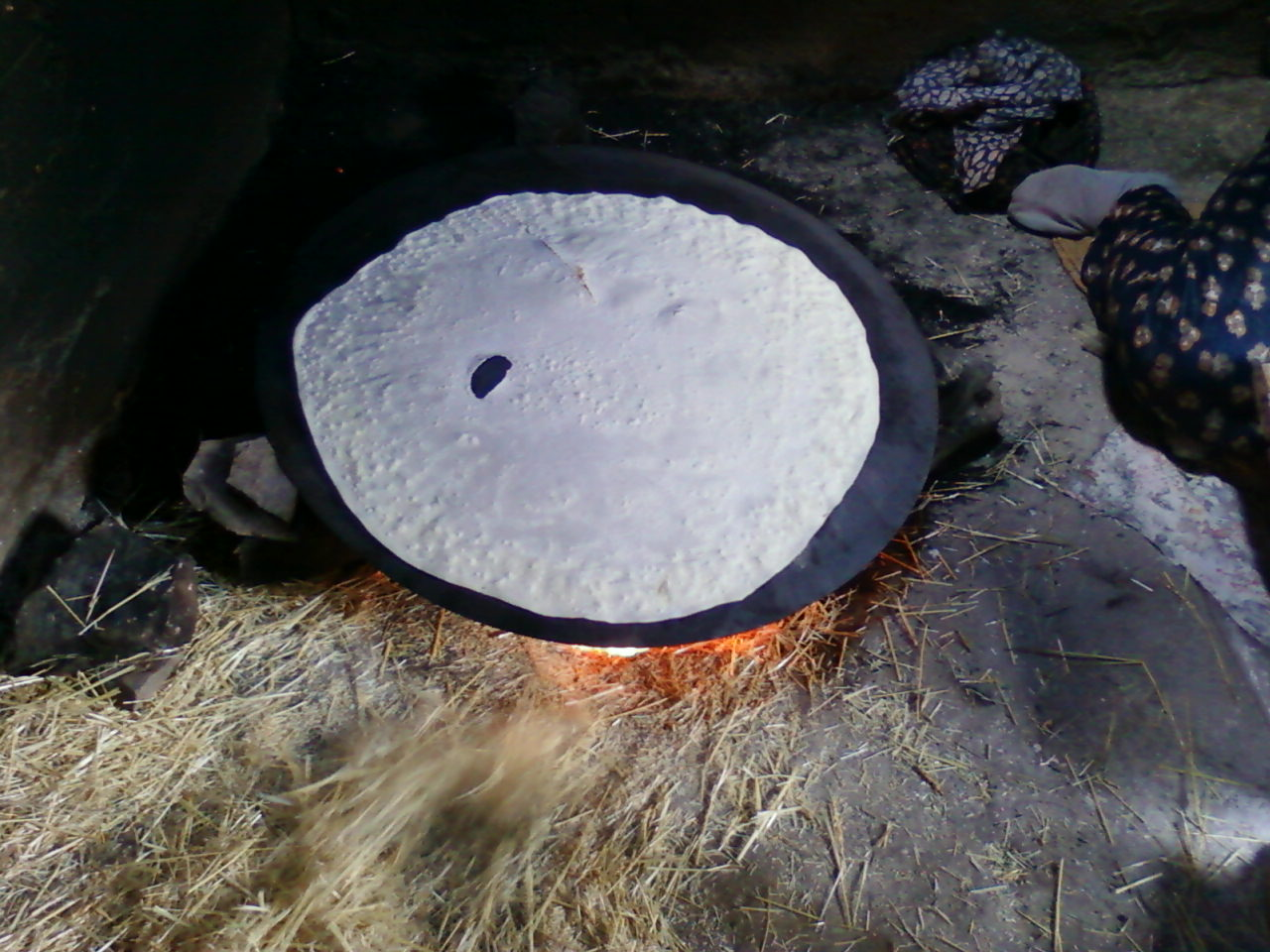
Making of Yufka

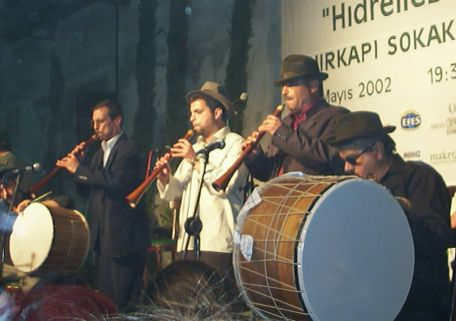
Hıdrellez celebration

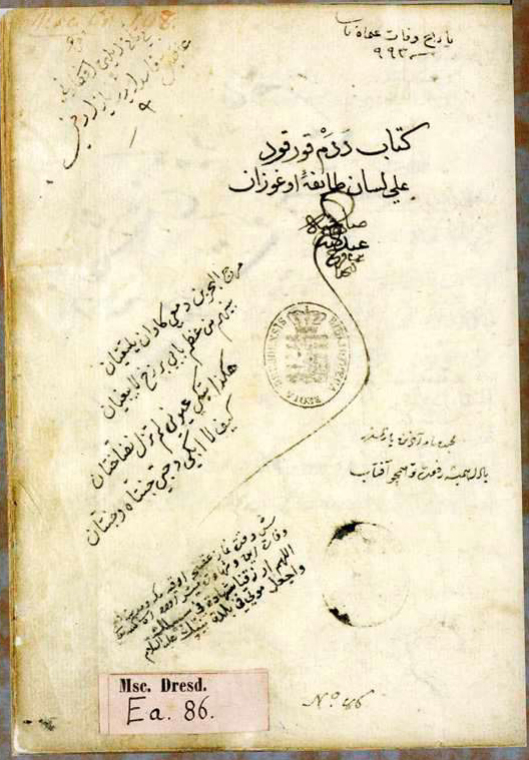
Book of Dede Korkut

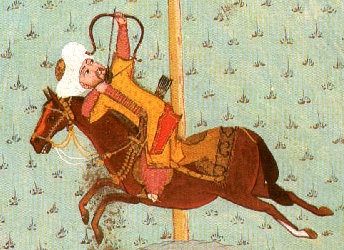
Turkish archery

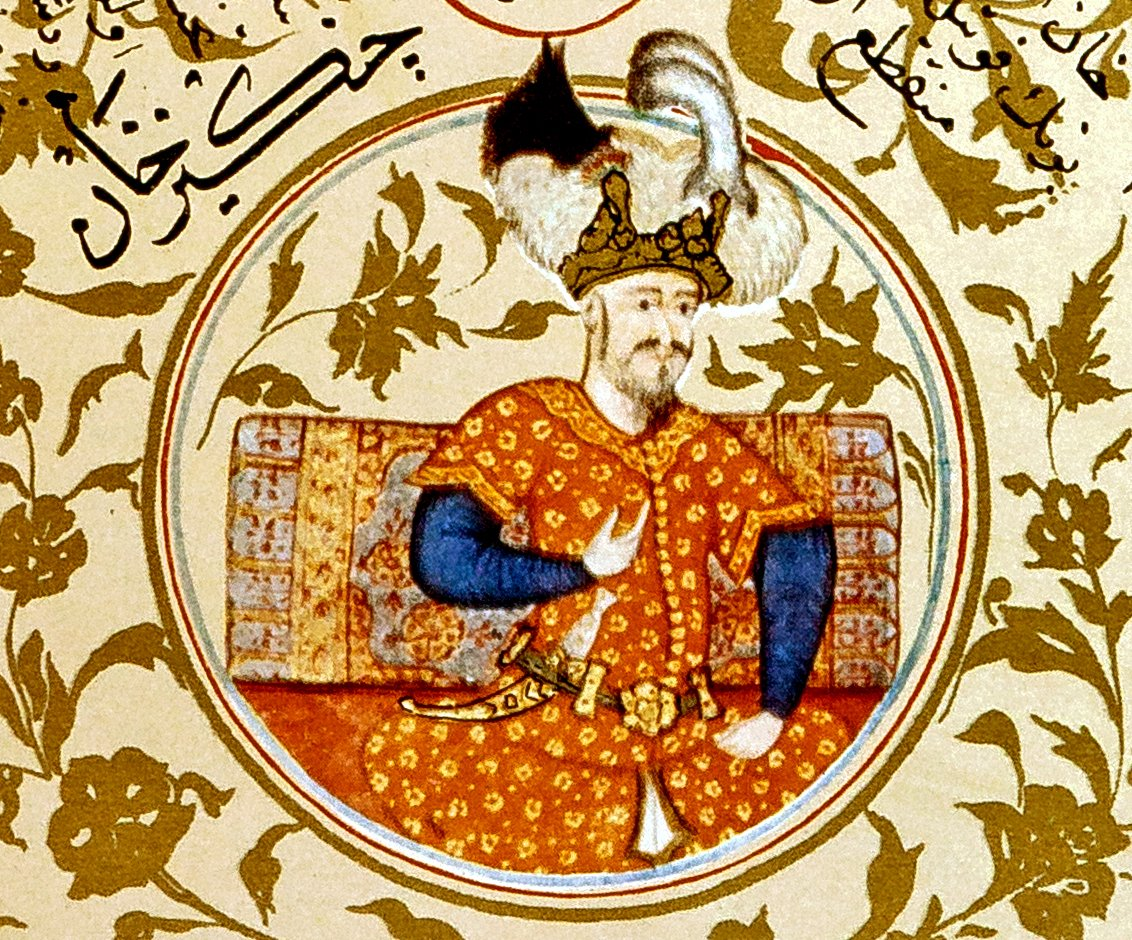
Ottoman miniature

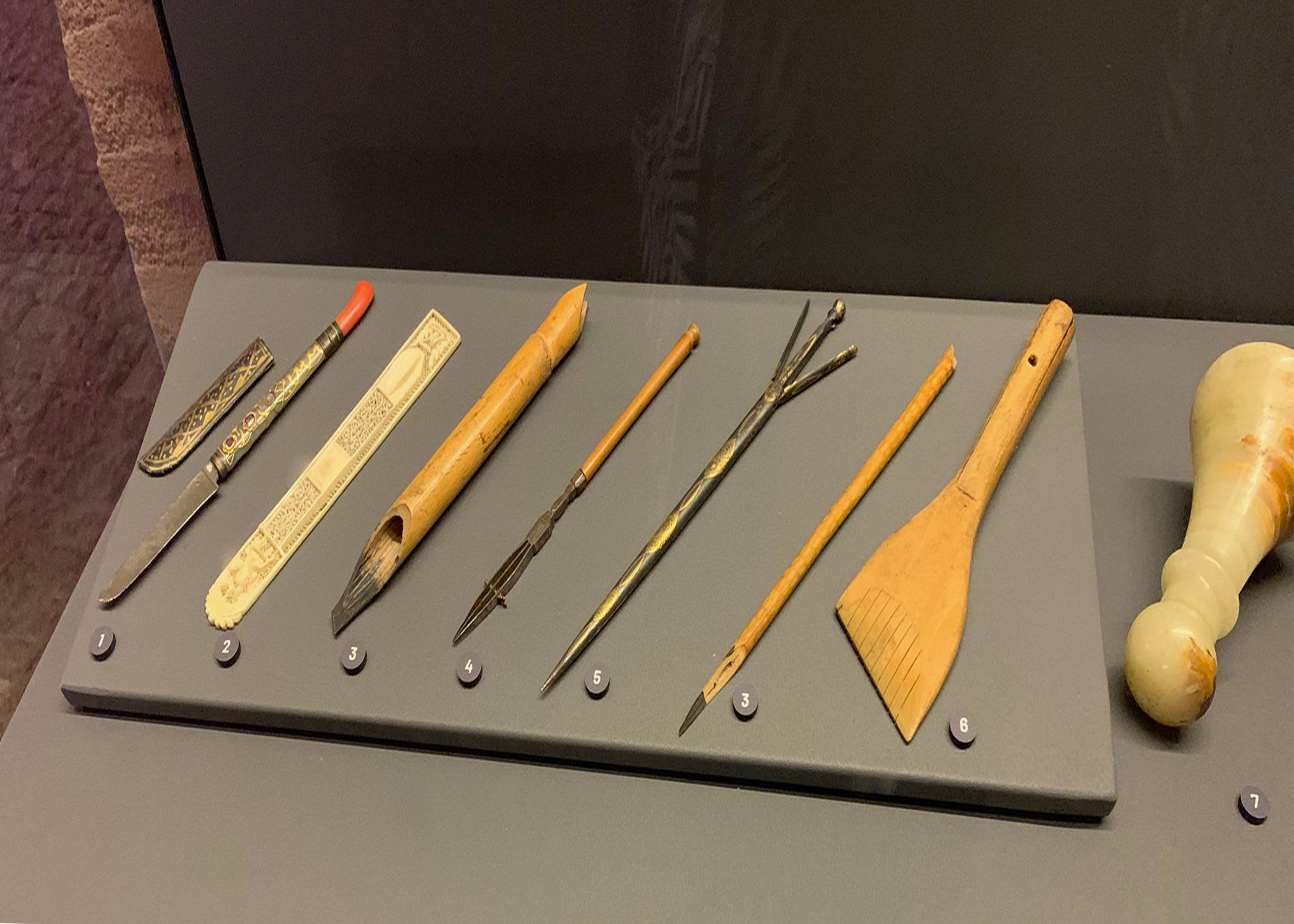
Wooden Calligraphy Tools

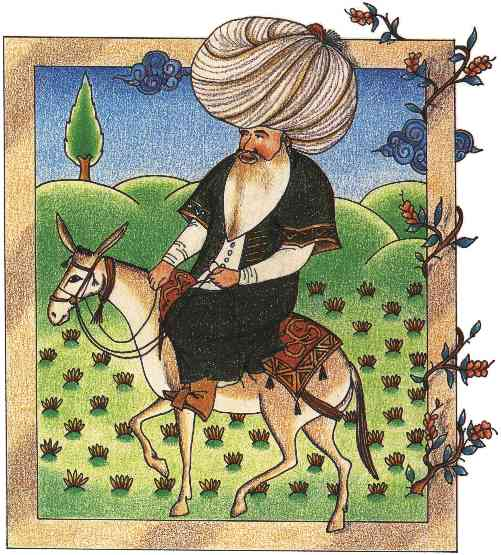
Nasreddin Hoca

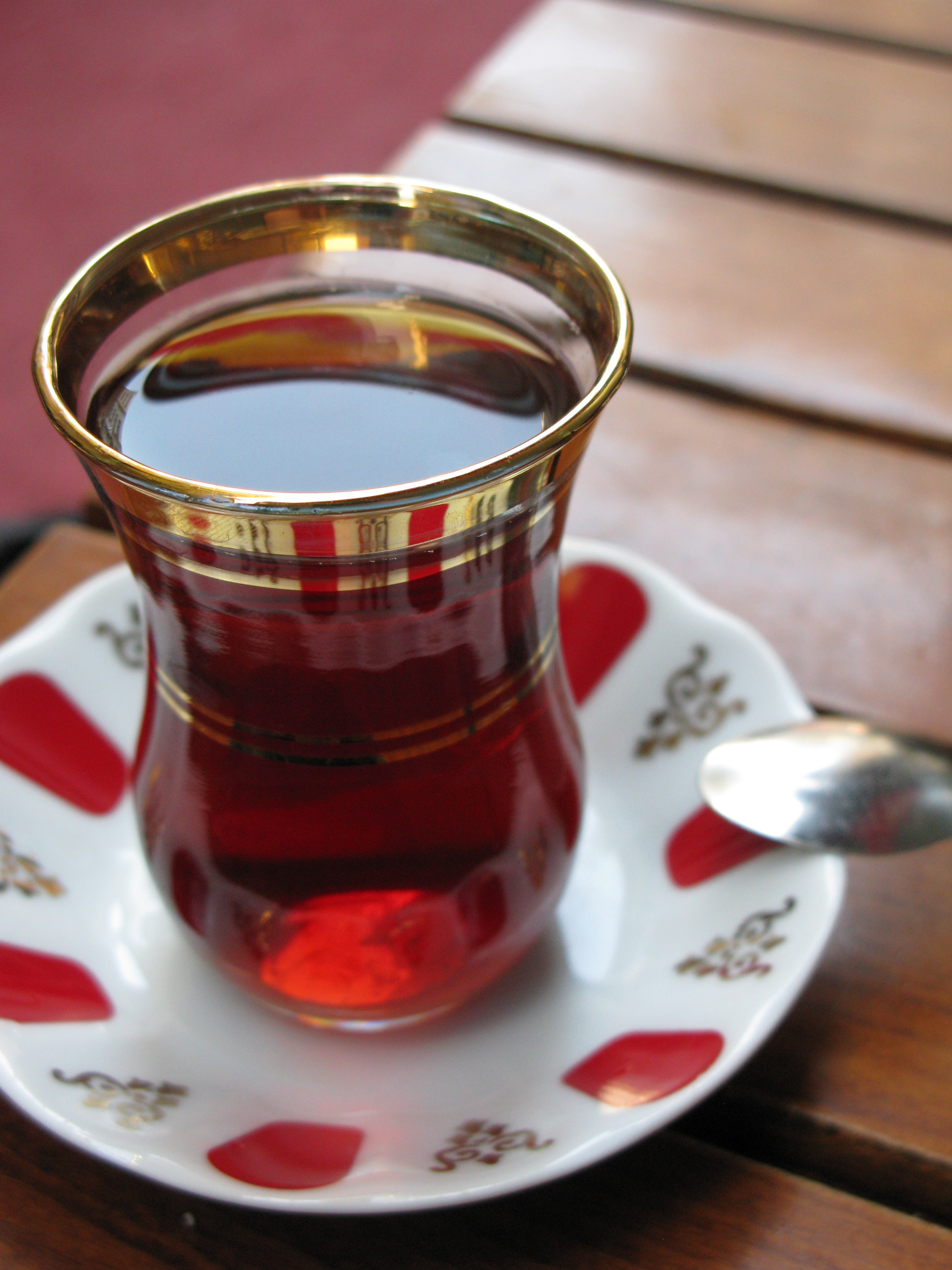
Tea in Turkey

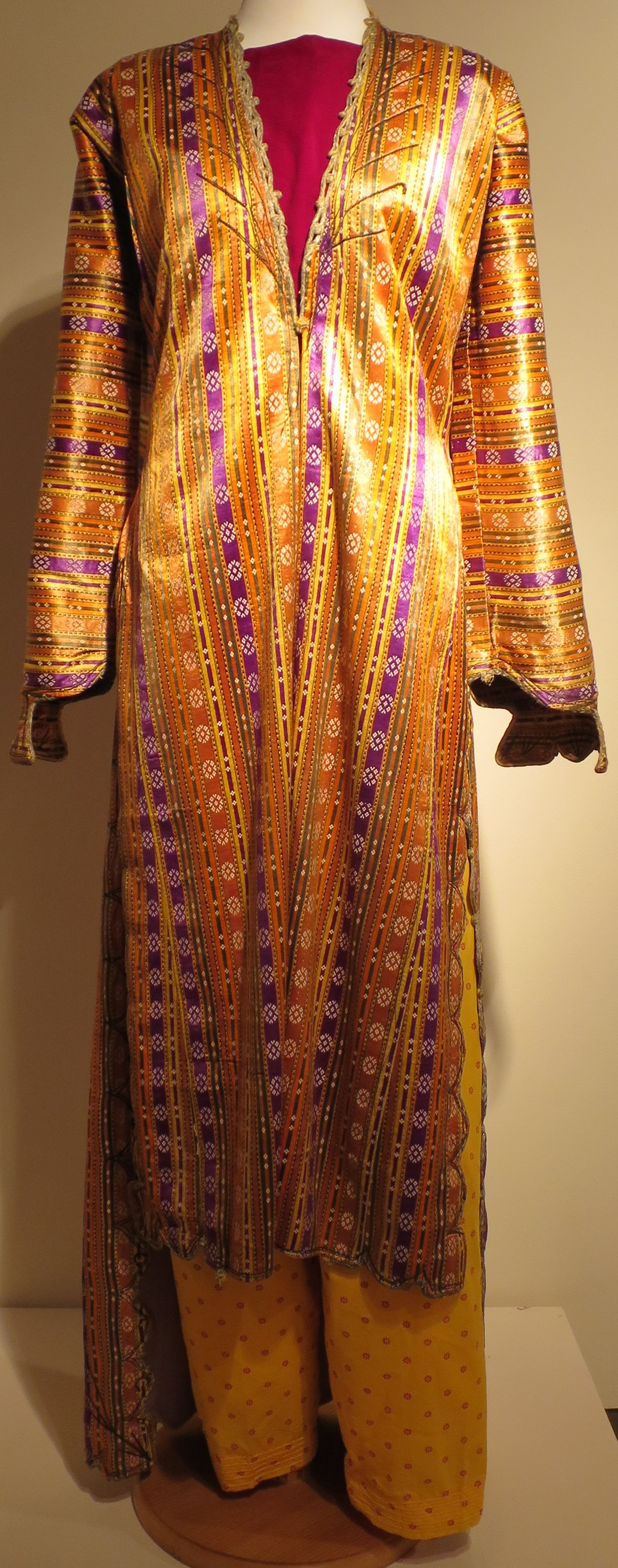
Lady's silk entari, a Turkish robe

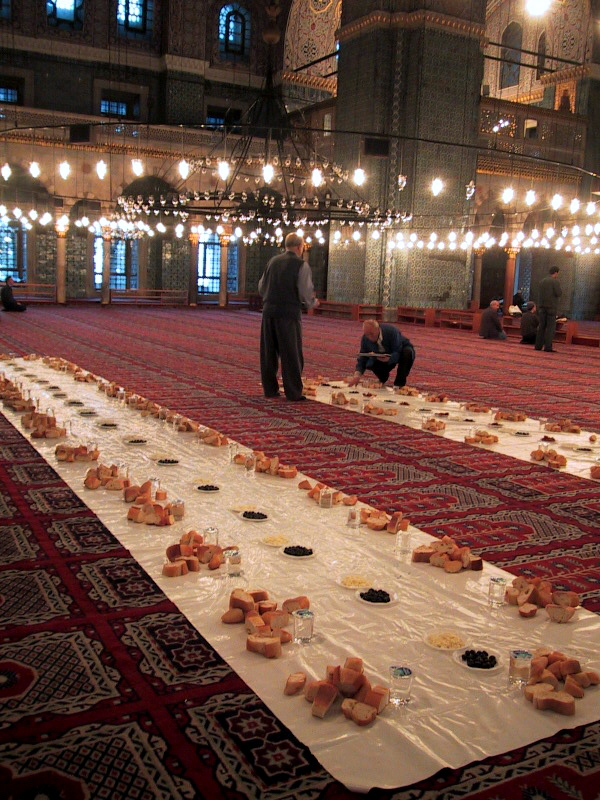
Iftar in Istanbul

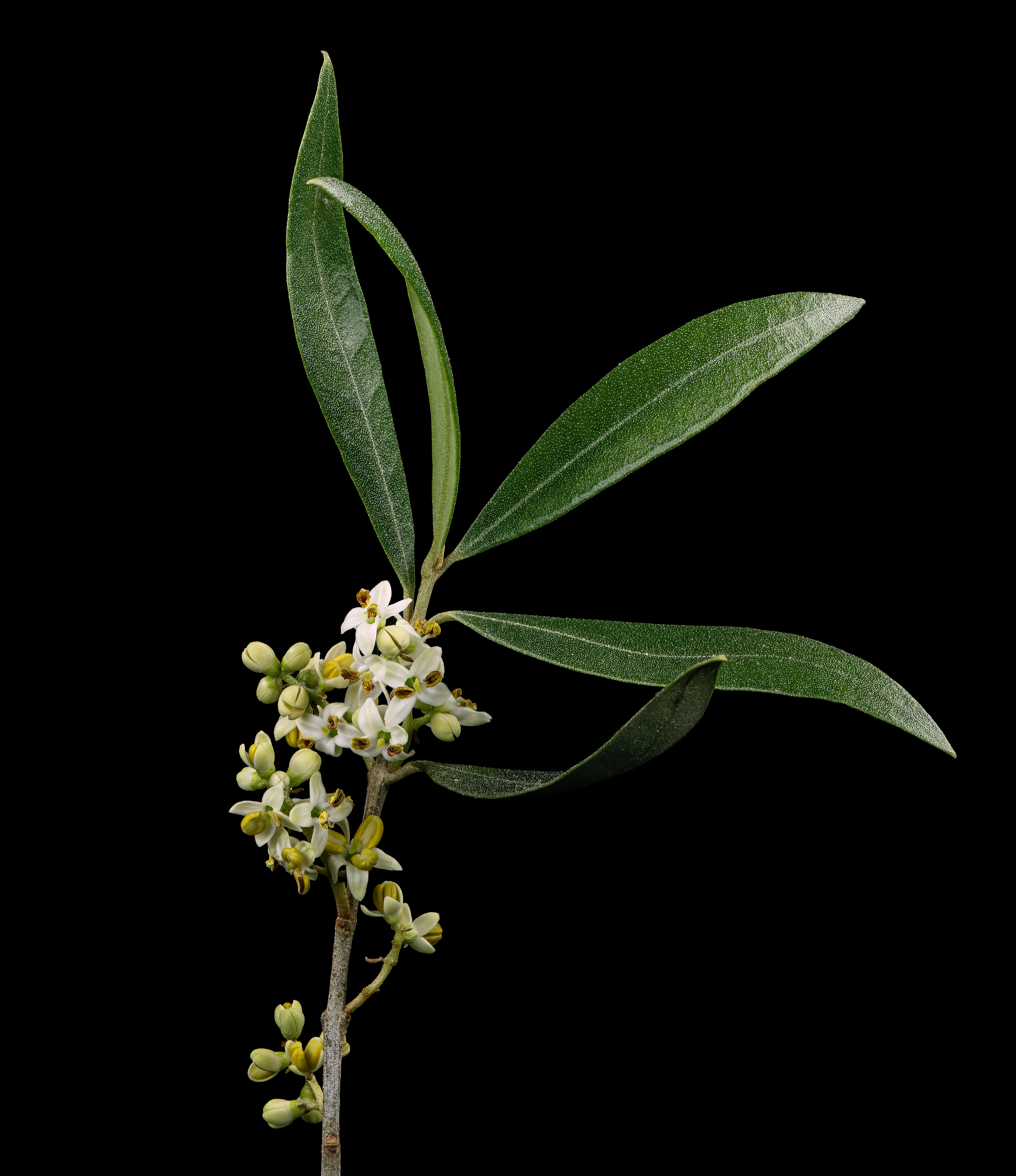
Olive cultivation

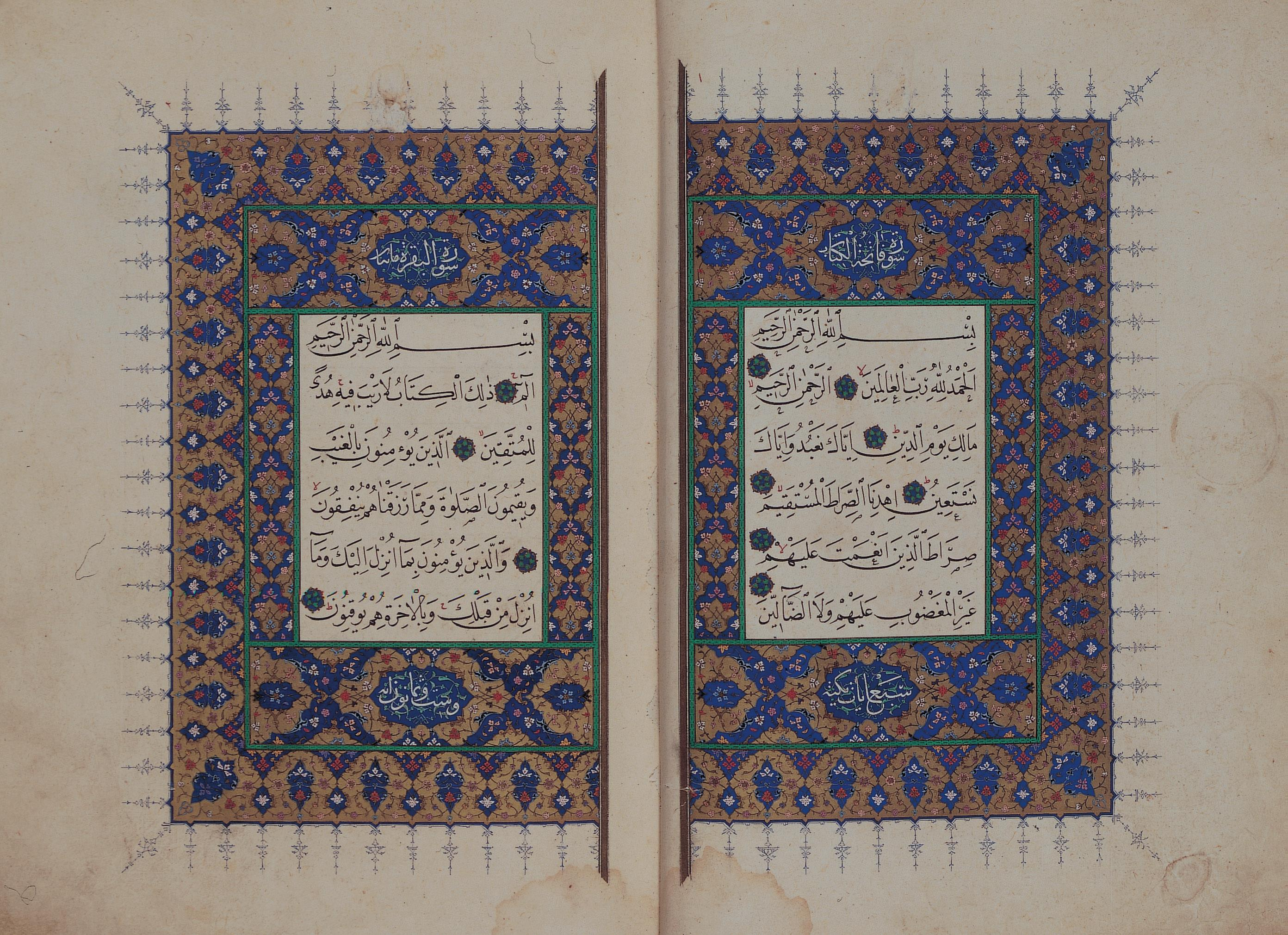
Quran with illumination

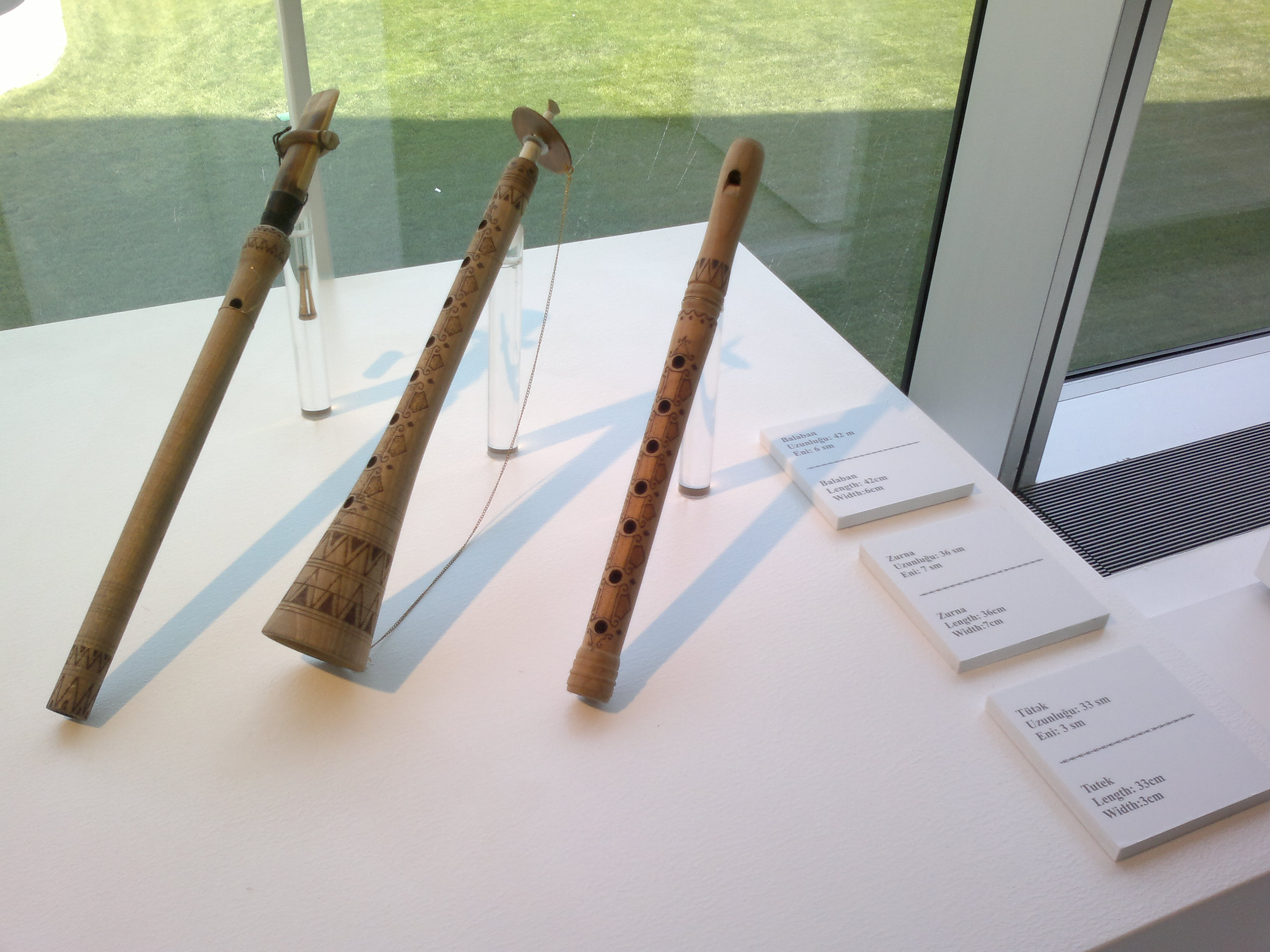
Balaban, musical instrument

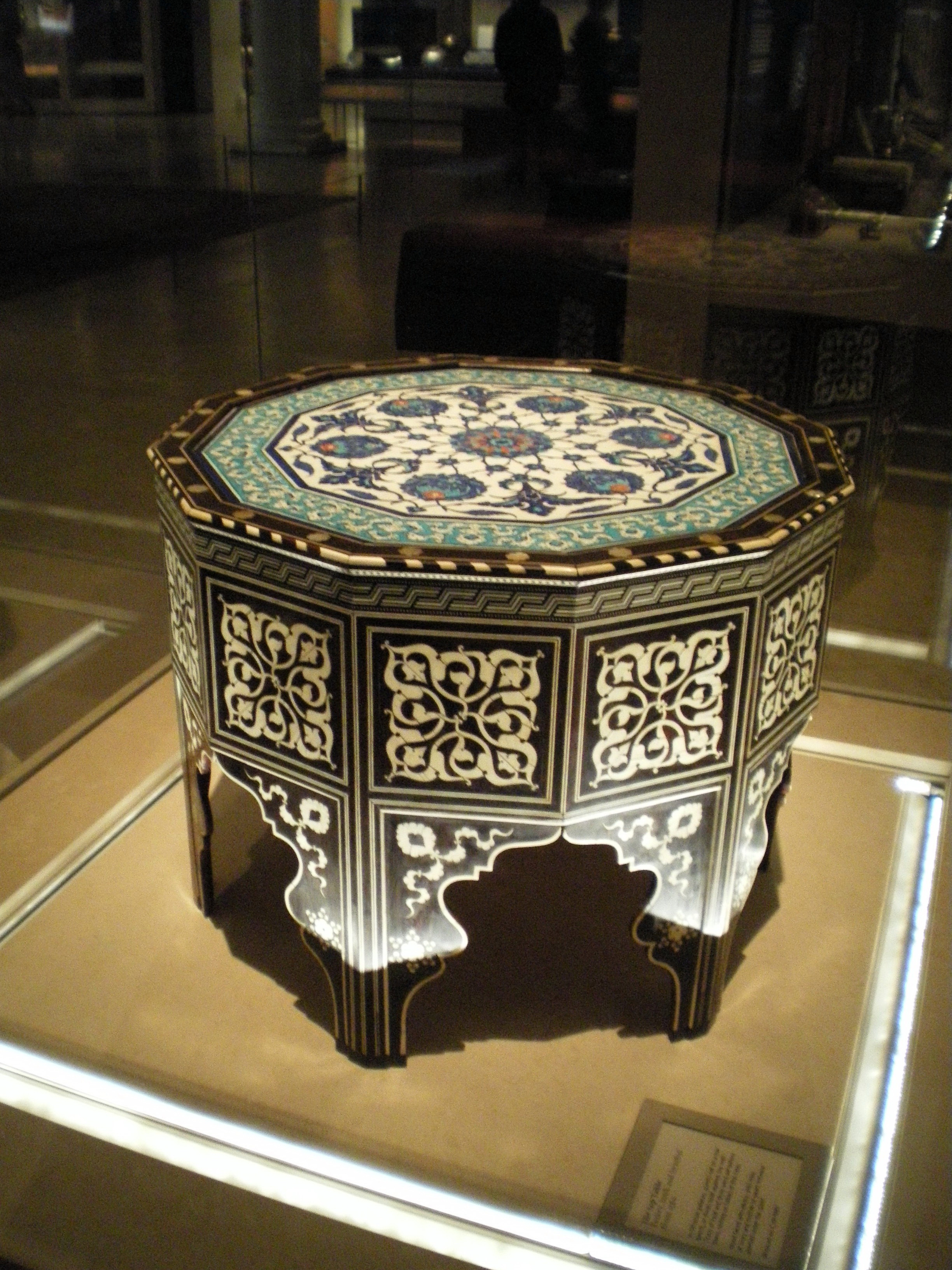
Ottoman table with mother of pearl

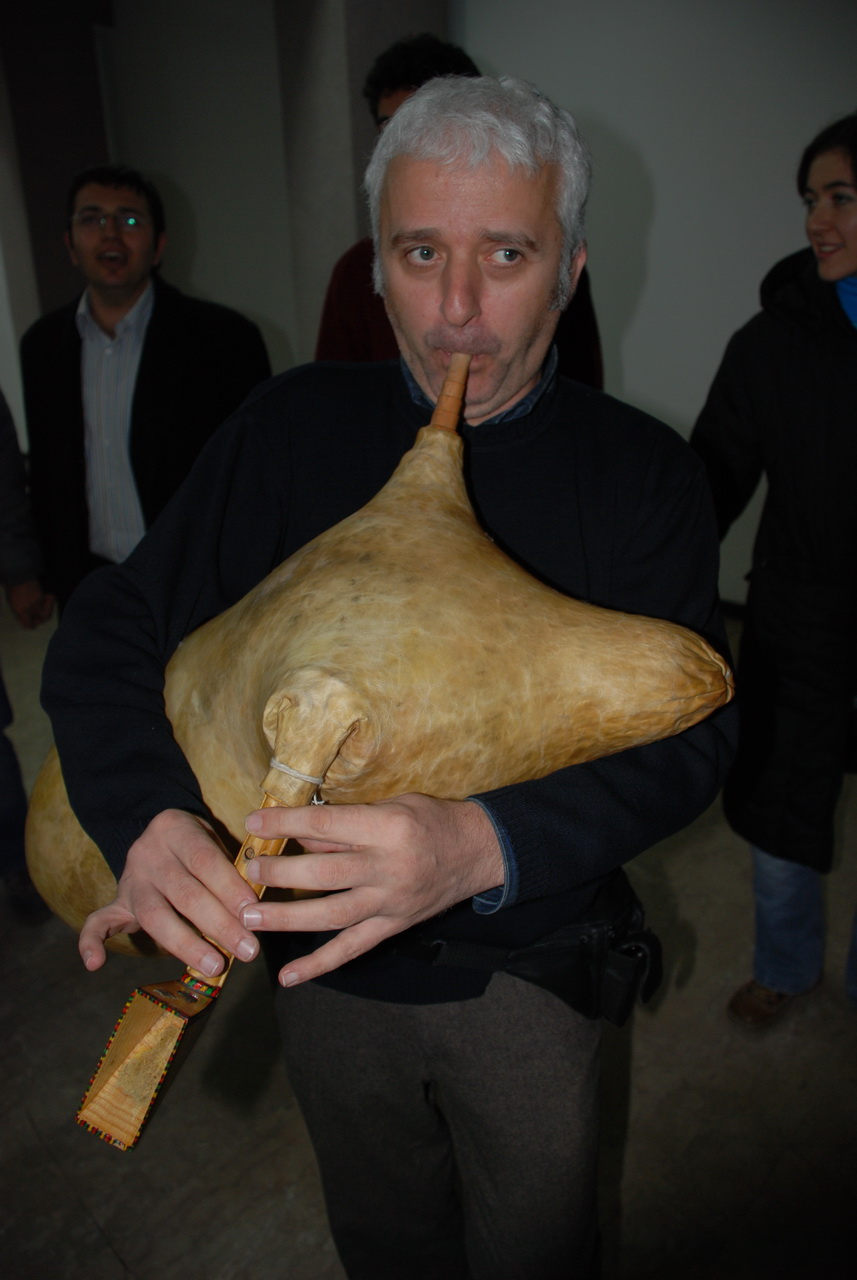
Turkish tulum

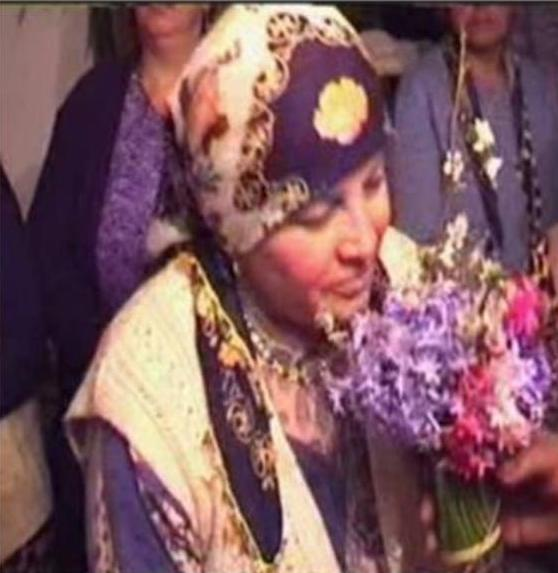
Nevruz in Thrace

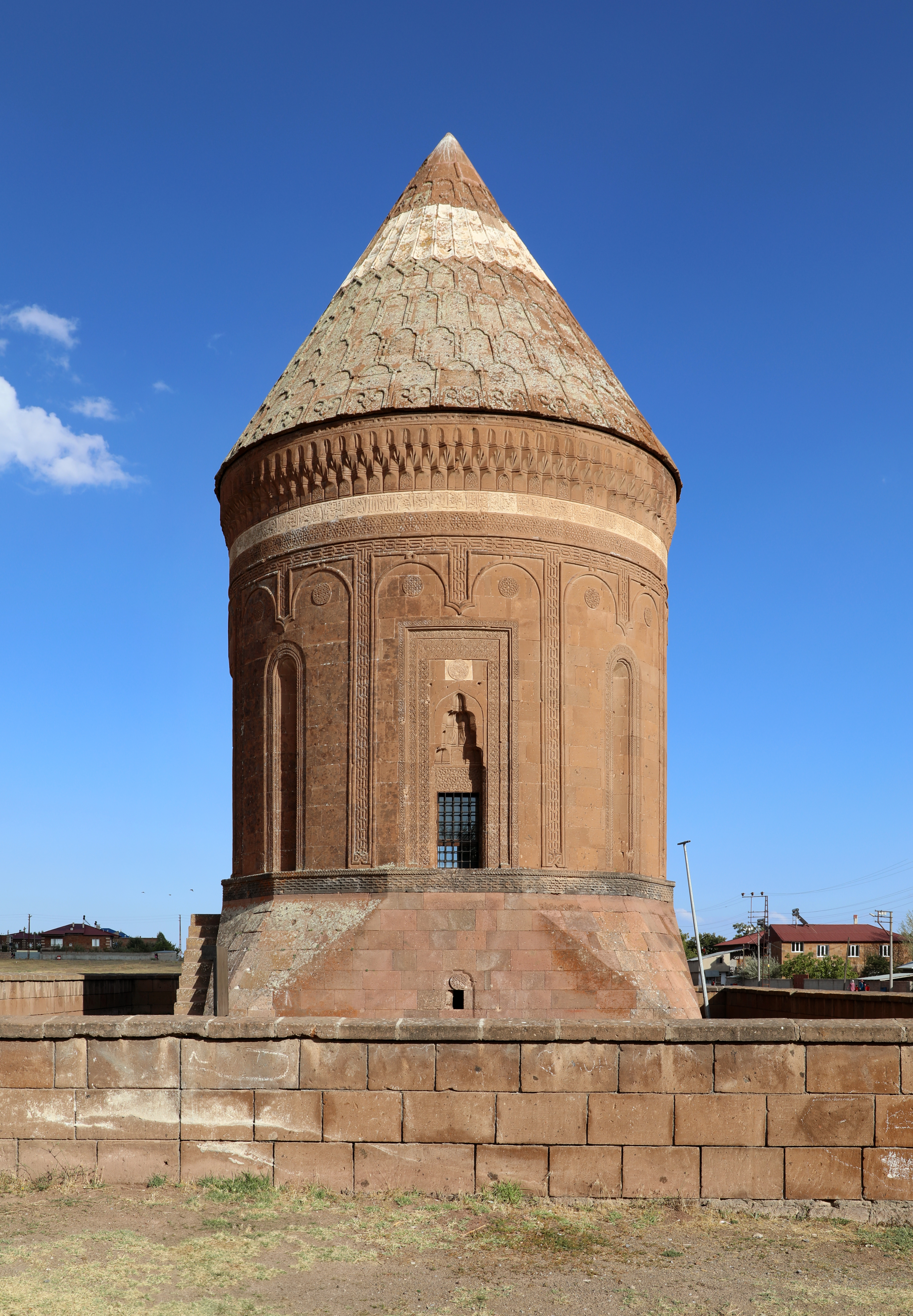
Ahlat stonework
