= Söhbətli =

- Municipality
- Location within Azerbaijan
- Coordinates: 41°21′49″N 48°51′27″E
- Country: Azerbaijan
- Rayon: Davachi

Population
  - Total: 355
- Time zone: UTC+4 (AZT)
  - Summer (DST): UTC+5 (AZT)

Söhbətli (also, Seybatli and Sokhbetli) is a village and municipality in the Shabran District of Azerbaijan. It has a population of 355.

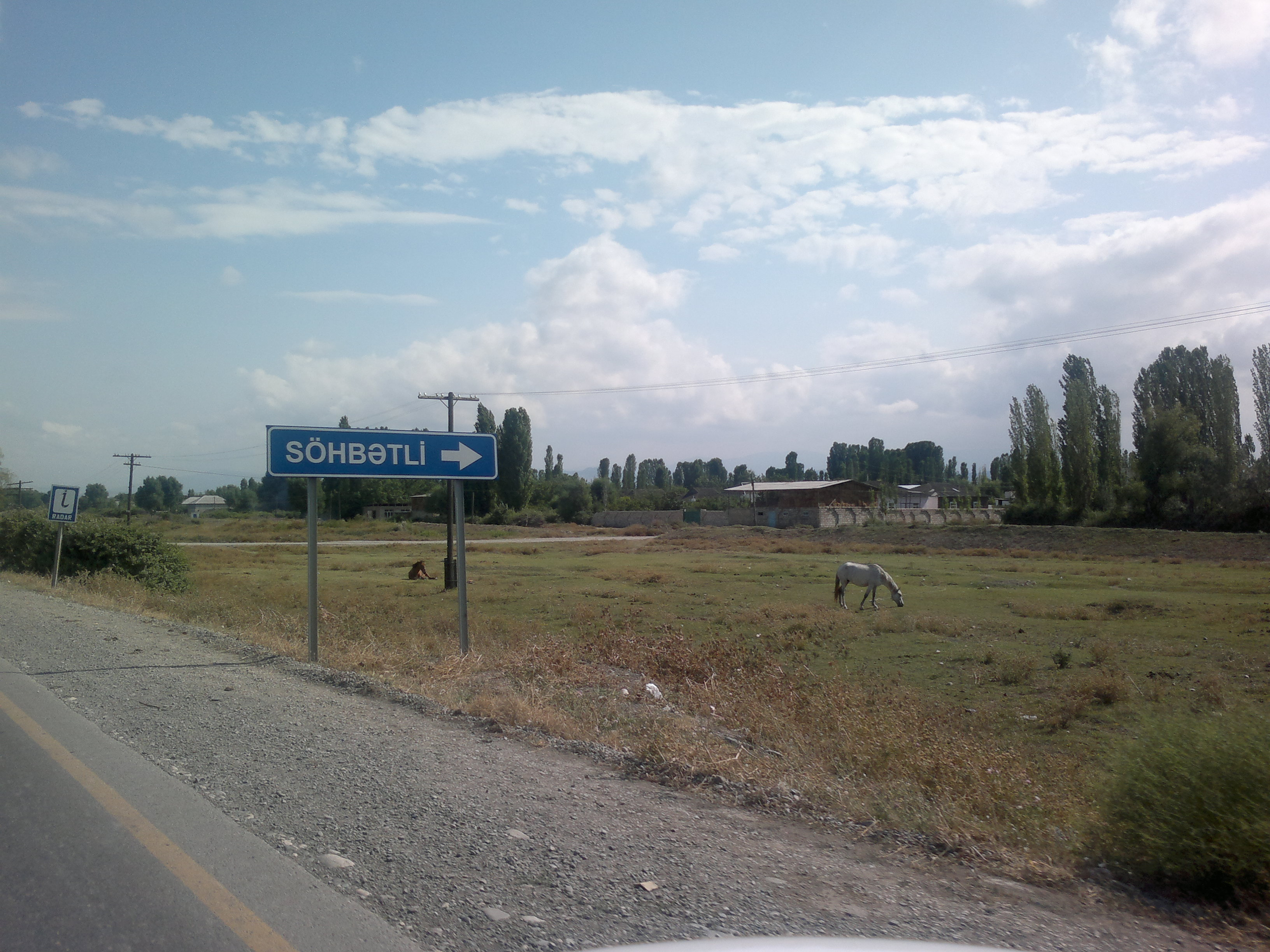
