= Sufi Center Rabbaniyya =

The Sufi Centre Rabbaniyya (formerly Sufi Centre Berlin) by the Sufi-Master Sheikh Eşref Efendi is a group of the Naqshbandi Sufi Order in Germany.

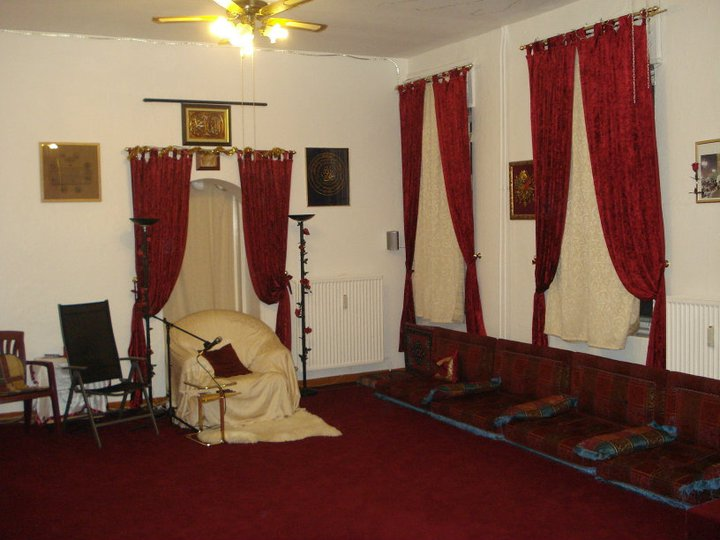
Assembly room of the Sufi-Center Berlin

== History ==
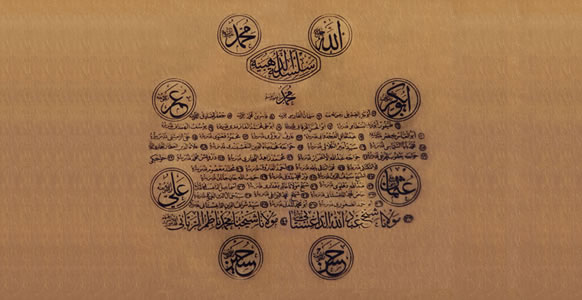
Golden chain of the Naqshbandi Order

The Sufi Centre Rabbaniyya and the head of the centre, Sheikh Eşref Efendi, belong to the Naqshbandi Sufi Order. It opened in the Reuterstrasse in Neukoelln in 2003 as the Sufi Centre Berlin. In 2008 it moved to the Wissmannstrasse 20, also in Neukoelln. In 2010 it changed its name to Sufi Centre Rabbaniyya.

After the order's Grandmaster, Maulana Sheikh Nazim el Rabbani, died in 2014, the group restructured, closed the center in Berlin, opened a new one in Cologne and moved to "sufiland" in Eigeltingen-Reute (Lake Constance), which was also newly opened.

The community of the Sufi Centre comprises approximately 500 people who meet for sohbets (spiritual speeches/addresses) and dhikrs (spiritual chanting) or watch live broadcasts of such.
