= Traditional Sohbet meetings =

Turkish social practice of community conversations

Sohbet meetings
- Genre: Community conversations
- Country: Turkey

Traditional Sohbet meetings
- UNESCO Intangible Cultural Heritage
- Country: Turkey
- Reference: 00385
- Region: Europe and North America

Inscription history
- Inscription: 2010 (5th session)
- List: Representative

The traditional Sohbet meetings (Turkish: Geleneksel Sohbet Toplantıları) is a Turkish social practice of community conversations. The communities consist exclusively of men above a certain age (typically 15 or 16), regardless of ethnicity, religion or status. The members must have honest families, trustworthy to keep secrets, respectful of their elders, and not gamble or display public drunkenness. In addition to conversations, the meetings may also include dancing, music, plays, and feasts of traditional dishes.

Traditional Sohbet meetings were included in the UNESCO lists of intangible cultural heritage of humanity. The decision of the UNESCO Committee stated:

Traditional Sohbet meetings are social practices that provide a forum for community members to keep alive their oral traditions, transmit their history and share their cultural values, providing them with a sense of identity and continuity;

== Names and Places ==
The term sohbet is of Arabic origin and means "conversation", with the special accent on being a friendly conversation for pleasant pastime. The term is selected as a representative name for Unesco official documentation, while these meetings are known under various local names across Turkey: “Yâran Sohbeti” in Çankırı, “Yaren Organization” in Kütahya-Simav, “Sıra Gecesi” in Şanlıurfa, “Kürsübaşı Sohbeti” in Elazığ and “Barana Sohbets” in Balıkesir-Dursunbey. Similar meetings can be seen with different names as “cümbüş” in Ankara and its surroundings, “Delikanlı Örgütü” in Kazan District of Ankara, “Gençler Heyeti” in Niğde-Dündarlı, “Gezek” in Kütahya City Center and Isparta, “Kef/Keyif” in Antalya and Isparta, “Muhabbet” in Beypazarı District of Ankara, Kırşehir, Yozgat, Karabük Safranbolu, “Oda Teşkilatı” in Balıkesir-Edremit, Manisa-Soma, “Oturmah” in Van, “Sıra Yârenleri” in Konya-Akşehir; Ardahan Erfene/Arfane in Ardahan, Gezek in Afyon, Erfane/Gezek in Bursa, Sıra Gecesi/Herfene in Erzincan, Velime Geceleri in Diyarbakır.
