= UNESCO International Days =

International days observed at UNESCO

World Days or International Days observed at UNESCO designated by United Nations General Assembly for marking and commemorating "important aspects of human life and history".

== January ==
- 14 January - World Logic Day
- 24 January - International Day of Education
- 24 January - World Day for African and Afrodescendant Culture
- 25 January - International Day of Women in Multilateralism
- 27 January - International Holocaust Remembrance Day

== February ==
- 11 February - International Day of Women and Girls in Science
- 13 February - World Radio Day
- 21 February - International Mother Language Day

== March ==
- 4 March - World Engineering Day for Sustainable Development
- 8 March - International Women’s Day
- 14 March - International Day of Mathematics
- 19 March - International Day for Digital Learning
- 20 March - International Francophonie Day
- 21 March - World Poetry Day
- 21 March - International Day for the Elimination of Racial Discrimination
- 21 March - International Day of Nowruz
- 22 March - World Water Day

== April ==
- 5 April - International Day of Conscience
- 6 April - International Day of Sport for Development and Peace
- 15 April - World Art Day
- 23 April - World Book and Copyright Day
- 29 April - International Dance Day
- 30 April - International Jazz Day

== May ==
- 3 May - World Press Freedom Day
- 5 May - African World Heritage Day
- 5 May - World Portuguese Language Day
- 12 May - International Nurses Day
- 16 May - International Day of Light
- 16 May - International Day of Living Together in Peace
- 20 May - World Metrology Day since 2023
- 21 May - World Day for Cultural Diversity for Dialogue and Development since 2002
- 22 May - International Day for Biological Diversity
- 24 May - International day of Markhor since 2024

== June ==
- 5 June - World Environment Day
- 5 June - Solomon Memorial Day
- 8 June - World Oceans Day
- 17 June - World Day to Combat Desertification and Drought

== July ==
- 7 July - Kiswahili Language Day
- 18 July - Nelson Mandela International Day
- 20 July - International chess day
- 26 July - International Day for the Conservation of the Mangrove Ecosystem

== August ==
- 9 August - International Day of the World's Indigenous People
- 12 August - International Youth Day
- 23 August - International Day for the Remembrance of the Slave Trade and its Abolition

== September ==
- 8 September - International Literacy Day
- 9 September - International Day to Protect Education from Attack
- 15 September - International Day of Democracy
- 20 September - International Day of University Sport
- 21 September - International Day of Peace
- 22 September - World Dates Day
- 28 September - International Day for the Universal Access to Information

World Dates Day is an initiative proposed by Mouhab Alawar to celebrate World Dates Day on 22 Sep

== October ==
- 5 October - World Teachers' Day
- 6 October - International Geodiversity Day
- 11 October - International Day of the Girl Child
- 13 October - International Day for Disaster Reduction
- 17 October - International Day for the Eradication of Poverty
- 17 October - International Day of the Intangible Cultural Heritage
- 24 October - United Nations Day
- 27 October - World Day for Audiovisual Heritage
- 29 October - World Coding Day

== November ==
- First Thursday of November- International Day Against Violence and Bullying at School including Cyberbullying
- 2 November - International Day to End Impunity for Crimes against Journalists
- 3 November - International Day for Biosphere Reserves
- 5 November - World Day of Romani Language
- 5 November - World Tsunami Awareness Day
- 7 November - International Day against violence and bullying at school including cyberbullying
- 10 November - World Science Day for Peace and Development
- 14 November - International Day against Illicit Trafficking in Cultural Property
- 16 November - International Day for Tolerance
- 18 November - International Day of Islamic Art
- 20 November - World Philosophy Day (Celebrated on the third Thursday of November)
- 21 November - World Television Day
- 25 November - International Day for the Elimination of Violence against Women
- 26 November - World Olive Tree Day
- 29 November - International Day of Solidarity with the Palestinian People

== December ==
- 1 December - World AIDS Day
- 2 December - World Futures Day
- 3 December - International Day of Persons with Disabilities
- 10 December - Human Rights Day
- 18 December - International Migrants Day
- 18 December - World Arabic Language Day

== See also ==
- List of United Nations observances
- List of environmental dates
- List of food days
- Lists of holidays
- List of holidays by country
