= CEC =

CEC may refer to:

== Organisations ==
- California Energy Commission, US
- Canadian Electroacoustic Community
- Center for Elephant Conservation, Florida, US
- Charismatic Episcopal Church
- China Enterprise Confederation
- Citizens Electoral Council, a political party in Australia now known as Australian Citizens Party
- Civil Engineer Corps, of the US Navy
- City of Edinburgh Council
- Commission for Environmental Cooperation, an intergovernmental environmental organization
- Commission of the European Communities (EC)
- Commonwealth Engineers Council, a network of professional Commonwealth engineering organisations
- Conference of European Churches

=== Education ===
- Canadian Ecology Centre
- Career Enrichment Center, an Albuquerque Public Schools Magnet High School, US
- Cebu Eastern College, Cebu City, Philippines
- Central European Convention, a subgroup of the International Association for the Exchange of Students for Technical Experience
- Centro de Educación Continua at the National Polytechnic School, Quito, Ecuador
- Chinese Education Center, an elementary school in San Francisco, California, US
- Cobequid Educational Centre, a high school in Truro, Nova Scotia, Canada
- College of Engineering Chengannur, Kerala, India
- College of Engineering, Cherthala, Kerala, India
- Cranbrook Educational Community, Detroit, US

=== Elections ===
- Central Election Commission (Taiwan)
- Central Election Commission (Ukraine)
- Central Election Commission of the Russian Federation
- National Executive of Bharatiya Janata Party § Central Election Committee, in India
- Chief Election Commissioner of India
- Central Elections Committee (Israel)

=== Companies ===
- Career Education Corporation, a US postsecondary higher education provider
- Caesars Entertainment Corporation, a US gaming corporation
- CEC Bank, a Romanian bank
- China Electronics Corporation, a Chinese telecom company
- Chuck E. Cheese, a chain of American family entertainment center restaurants, a brand of CEC Entertainment
- Clean Energy Collective, a US clean energy company
- Community Education Centers, a former private for-profit prison company based in New Jersey, US
- Continental Engineering Corporation, a Taiwanese Construction Company
- Círculo de Escritores Cinematográficos (Cinema Writers Circle), a Spanish not-for-profit supporting filmmakers
  - CEC Awards, film awards made by the Cinema Writers Circle
- Consolidated Engineering Corporation, a former private company for chemical instruments

== Science and technology ==
- Canadian Electrical Code
- Cation-exchange capacity, in soil sciences
- Circulating endothelial cell, endothelial cells that have been shed from the lining of the vascular wall into the blood stream
- Consumer Electronics Control, a part of the HDMI interface specification
- Cooperative Engagement Capability, a military target information sharing network
- Contaminants of emerging concern
- IEEE Congress on Evolutionary Computation, a computer science conference

== Other uses ==
- Cambridge English Corpus, a text corpus of English language
- Camouflage Europe Centrale, the standard camouflage pattern of the French military
- Canadian Engineering Competition, of the Canadian Federation of Engineering Students
- Certified Executive Chef, an American Culinary Federation (ACF) certification
- Concordance Extraction Corporation, a fictional deep space mining company in the video game Dead Space
- Consol Energy Center, an indoor arena in Pittsburgh, Pennsylvania, US
- Continuing Education Credit, a measure used in continuing education
- Cruzeiro Esporte Clube, a Brazilian football club
- IATA code "CEC" for Del Norte County Airport
