= Asian Symposium on Medicinal Plants, Spices and Other Natural Products =

ASOMPS is the abbreviation for Asian Symposium on Medicinal Plants, Spices and Other Natural Products, which is a series of scientific conferences held in Asia at different locations.

The original title was Asian Symposium on Medicinal Plants and Spices and was modified as Asian Symposium on Medicinal Plants, Spices and Other Natural Products from the 7th meeting in 1992 in Manila, Philippines. The acronym ASOMPS was first introduced in the 4th symposium in 1980 in Bangkok, Thailand.

== Background ==
The First Asian Symposium on Medicinal Plants and Species (ASOMPS I) was held in Peshawar, Pakistan in 1960 with the aim of strengthening regional research potential and improving infrastructures in the Asian region. ASOMPS promotes collaboration and co-operation between Asian scientists in the fields of chemistry, pharmacology, pharmacy, biochemistry, botany, and biotechnology and their research on natural products.

Similar to the Botany 2000 program, later on, all ASOMPS meetings were organized under the auspices of UNESCO, as a basic science program, to contribute to the strengthening of substantial financial assistance obtained from UNESCO head office through the country participation of the respective host countries.

ASOMPS have also been regularly supported by International Foundation for Science (IFS) and the Regional Network for the Chemistry of Natural Products in Southeast Asia (RNCNPSA). Government of the respective host countries made generous contributions to the ASOMPS meetings. National Organizing Committee (NOC) of the respective host countries raised funds from different local and international organizations through donations, advertisements and exhibitions.

== Symposia ==
- ASOMPS II (1964, Kandy, Sri Lanka)
- ASOMPS III (February 1977, Colombo, Sri Lanka)
- ASOMPS IV (15–19 September 1980, Bangkok, Thailand)
- ASOMPS V (August 1984, Seoul, Korea)
- ASOMPS VI (24–28 January 1989, Bandung, Indonesia)
- ASOMPS VII (2–7 February 1992, Manila, Philippines)
- ASOMPS VIII (12–16 June 1994, Melaka, Malaysia)
- ASOMPS IX (24–28 September 1998, Hanoi, Vietnam)
- ASOMPS X (18–23 November 2000, Dhaka, Bangladesh)
- ASOMPS XI (26–30 October 2003, Kunming, China)
- ASOMPS XII (13–18 November 2006, Padang, Indonesia)
- ASOMPS XIII (3–6 November 2008, Hyderabad, India)
- ASOMPS XIV (9-12 December 2013, Karachi, Pakistan)
- ASOMPS XVIII (5-7 October 2023, Bandung, West Java, Indonesia)

Now ASOMPS has turned into a leading series of International Symposia with direct emphasis on natural products research. Presently, this event has been participated not only by Asian scientists, but also by a number of European and US scientists. The main topics of discussion in ASOMPS have been extended to relevant area of biomedical sciences as well.

ASOMPS IX was held on 24–28 September 1998 in Hanoi, Vietnam. This conference was sponsored by UNESCO and by members of the Asian Coordinating Group for Chemistry (ACGC) and was hosted by the Institute of Natural Products Chemistry of the National Centre for Natural Science and Technology, Hanoi. Volume 11 (2000) of ACGC Chemical Research Communications records the proceedings of this international symposium and includes papers and abstracts delivered by the plenary and invited lecturers.

The latest ASOMPS XIII was recently held on 3–6 November 2008 at the Indian Institute of Chemical Technology in Hyderabad, India. A group photo of participants can be seen on the homepage of ASOMPS XIII:

The Federation of Asian Chemical Societies (FACS) also hosts information on ASOMPS:
