= World Federation of Engineering Organizations =

International engineering organization

- Abbreviation: WFEO; FMOI
- Formation: 1968; 58 years ago
- Type: NGO
- Legal status: Active
- Headquarters: Paris, France
- Members: 100 nations
- Head: Mustafa Shehu; President of WFEO
- Website: WFEO.net

The World Federation of Engineering Organizations (French: Federation Mondiale des Organisations d'Ingenieurs; WFEO) is an international, non-governmental organization representing the engineering profession worldwide.

Founded in 1968 by a group of regional engineering organizations, under the auspices of the United Nations Educational, Scientific and Cultural Organizations (UNESCO) in Paris, WFEO is a non governmental international organization that brings together national engineering organizations from over 90 nations and represents some 20 million engineers from around the world. WFEO is part of the United Nations system as an NGO in official relations with UNESCO (associate status) since its foundation, and as taking part in the work of its main bodies, mainly the United Nations Economic and Social Council (ECOSOC) and its specialized agencies, notably the United Nations Industrial Development Organization, the United Nations Environment Programme. At the UN ECOSOC, WFEO co-organizes with the International Science Council the Scientific and Technological Community Major Group.

In 2019, based on proposal by WFEO, the UNESCO's General Conference approved the creation of the UNESCO World Engineering Day for Sustainable Development, to be celebrated on 4 March of each year. Since then, WFEO has been coordinating the related celebrations around the world, through its membership and partnering institutions.

== Structure, membership, activities ==
The governing body of WFEO is the General Assembly. Between meetings of the General Assembly the affairs of the Federation are directed by the Executive Council. The business of the Federation is dealt with by the Executive Board, supported by the Executive Director. Actions the General Assembly, Executive Council, or Executive Board are by majority vote. WFEO's membership comprises a hundred member institutions, including national members representing a country, and international members representing either a global region or continent, or representing a branch of the engineering profession at the global scale.

=== Committees ===
WFEO's main activities in specialized fields of engineering is carried out by its committees, which are hosted by national members for a four-year term.

- Anti-corruption
- Disaster Risk Management
- Education in Engineering
- Energy
- Information & Communication
- Engineering & the Environment
- Engineering Capacity Building
- Engineering for Innovative Technology
- Water
- Women in Engineering
- Young Engineers / Future Leaders

=== Conferences ===
WFEO body meets annually for the General Assembly or Executive Council, and the Committees' meetings. These meetings are framed by a conference, where non affiliated engineers can join. In general these meetings and conferences are held in November.

Last conferences
Year	City	Country	Name of the conference	Theme
2009	Kuwait City	Kuwait		Alternative Energy Applications – Option or Necessity
2010	Buenos Aires	Argentina	World Engineering Week (WEW)	Technology, Innovation and Production for Sustainable Development
2011	Geneva	Switzerland	World Engineering Conference (WEC)	
2012	Ljubljana	Slovenia	World Engineering Forum (WEF)	Sustainable Construction for People
2013	Singapore	Singapore	World Engineering Summit (WES)	Innovative and Sustainable Solutions to Climate Change
2014	Abuja	Nigeria	Nigeria, World Engineering Conference on Sustainable Infrastructure (WECSI)	Development of Sustainable Infrastructure in Africa
2015	Kyoto	Japan	World Engineering Conference and Convention (WECC)	Engineering: Innovation and Society
2016	Lima	Peru	World Engineering Conference ON Disaster Risk Reduction	Engineering: Disaster Risk
2017	Rome	Italy	World Engineering Forum	Engineering for humankind's heritage
2018	London	UK	Global Engineering Congress	Engineering for the Sustainable Development Goals
2019	Melbourne	Australia	World Engineering Convention	
2022	San José	Costa Rica	World Engineers Summit	

=== Presidents ===
WFEO's President is elected by the General Assembly for a two-years term, in the context of an immediate past president/president/president-elect system.

WFEO's presidents since its foundation
Years	President	Country
1968–1974	Eric Choisy	Switzerland
1975–1986	Sadok Ben Jemaa	Tunisia
1986–1991	A.Y Ishlinsky	Russia (U.S.S.R.)
1991–1995	William J. Caroll	US
1995–1999	Conrado Bauer	Argentina
1999–2003	José Medem	Spain
2003–2005	Dato Lee Yee Cheong	Malaysia
2005–2007	Kamel Ayadi	Tunisia
2007–2009	Barry Grear	Australia
2009–2011	Maria Prieto Laffargue	Spain
2011–2013	Adel Al-Kharafi	Kuwait
2013–2015	Marwan Abdelhamid	Palestine
2015–2017	Jorge Spitalnik	Brazil
2017–2019	Marlene Kanga	Australia
2019–2021	Gong Ke	China
2021–2023	José Manuel Vieira	Portugal
2023–2025	Mustafa Shehu	Nigeria

== International members ==
- Commonwealth Engineers Council (CEC)
- Federation of Arab Engineers (FAE)
- Federation of African Engineering Organizations (FAEO)
- European Federation of National Engineering Associations (FEANI)
- Federation of Engineering Institutions of South and Central Asia (FEISCA)
- Federation of Engineering Institutions of Asia and the Pacific (FEIAP)
- International Federation of Medical and Biological Engineering (IFMBE)
- International Federation of Municipal Engineers (IFME)
- Pan American Federation of Engineers Society (UPADI)
- Union of Scientific and Engineering Societies (USEA)
- World Council of Civil Engineers (WCCE)
