= Benefits of physical activity =

The benefits of physical activity range widely. Most types of physical activity improve health and well-being.

Physical activity refers to any bodily movement that expends energy through the use of skeletal muscles. A subset of physical activity, Exercise, is defined as planned, structured, and repetitive movement intended to improve or maintain physical fitness and overall health. A wide range of health benefits is associated with physical activity, making it a key factor in the prevention and management of various health conditions. Regular physical activity has been shown to help prevent or delay chronic illnesses such as cardiovascular disease, Type 2 diabetes, certain cancers, stroke, and hypertension. It is also associated with improved mental health outcomes, including reduced symptoms of Depression and anxiety.

== Recommended amount ==
Two and a half hours of moderate-intensity exercise per week is recommended for reducing the risk of health issues. However, even doing a small amount of exercise is healthier than doing none.

== Immediate benefits ==
Some of the benefits of physical activity on brain health happen right after a session of moderate to vigorous physical activity. Benefits include improved thinking or cognition for children ages 6-13, short-term reduction of anxiety for adults, and enhanced functional capacity in older adults. Regular physical activity can keep thinking, learning, and judgment skills sharp with age. It can also reduce the risk of depression and anxiety and improve sleep.

=== Weight management ===
Both dieting and physical activity play a critical role in maintaining healthy body weight, or maintaining successful weight loss. Physical activity helps control weight by using excess calories that would otherwise be stored as fat. Most activities burn calories, including sleeping, breathing, and digesting food. Balancing the calories consumed with the calories burned through physical activity will maintain one's weight.

== Long-term benefits ==
Frequent physical activity lowers the risk of cardiovascular diseases, type 2 diabetes, and some cancers.

Obesity is a complex disease that affects whole-body metabolism and is associated with an increased risk of cardiovascular disease (CVD) and Type 2 diabetes (T2D). Physical exercise results in numerous health benefits and is an important tool to combat obesity and its co-morbidities, including cardiovascular diseases. Exercise prevents both the onset and development of cardiovascular disease and is an important therapeutic tool to improve outcomes for patients with cardiovascular disease. Some benefits of exercise include enhanced mitochondrial function, restoration and improvement of vasculature, and the release of myokines from skeletal muscle that preserve or augment cardiovascular function. In this review, we will discuss the mechanisms through which exercise promotes cardiovascular health. Regular physical exercise has several beneficial effects on overall health. While decreasing body mass and adiposity are not the primary outcomes of exercise, exercise can mediate several diseases that accompany obesity, including T2D and CVD. Several recent studies have shown that sustained physical activity is associated with decreased markers of inflammation, improved metabolic health, decreased risk of heart failure, and improved overall survival. There are several risk factors leading to the development and progression of CVD, but one of the most prominent is a sedentary lifestyle. A sedentary lifestyle can be characterized by both obesity and consistently low levels of physical activity. Thus, lifestyle interventions that aim to increase physical activity and decrease obesity are attractive therapeutic methods to combat most non-congenital types of CVD.

=== Effect on cardiovascular risk factors ===
Regular physical exercise is associated with numerous health benefits to reduce the progression and development of diseases. Several randomized clinical trials have demonstrated that lifestyle interventions, including moderate exercise and a healthy diet, improve cardiovascular health in at-risk populations. Individuals with metabolic syndrome who participated in a 4-month program of either a diet (caloric restriction) or exercise intervention had reduced adiposity, decreased systolic, diastolic, and mean arterial blood pressure, and lower total and low-density lipoprotein (LDL) cholesterol lipid profiles compared to the control group. Both the diet and exercise interventions improve these cardiovascular outcomes to a similar extent.

Several previous studies have investigated the effects of diet and exercise, independently or in combination, on metabolic and cardiovascular health and have determined that diet, exercise, or a combination of diet and exercise induces weight loss, decreases visceral adiposity, lowers plasma triglycerides, plasma glucose, HDL levels, and blood pressure, and improves VO2max. Studies have shown that exercise can improve metabolic and cardiovascular health independent of changes in body weight, including improved glucose homeostasis, endothelial function, blood pressure, and HDL levels. These data indicate exercise, independent of changes in body mass, results in significant improvements in cardiovascular and metabolic health. Although a detailed analysis of the vast impact of diet on cardiometabolic health is outside the scope of this review, the importance of diet and exercise in tandem should not be ignored, as many studies have shown that cardiometabolic health is improved to a higher extent in response to a combined diet and exercise programs compared to either intervention alone.

Exercise has a similar effect on cardiovascular improvements in lean and overweight normoglycemic subjects. In a 1-year study of non-obese individuals, a 16–20% increase in energy expenditure (of any form of exercise) with no diet intervention resulted in a 22.3% decrease in body fat mass and reduced LDL cholesterol, total cholesterol/HDL ratio, and C-reactive protein concentrations, all risk factors associated with CVD. In overweight individuals, 7–9 months of low-intensity exercise (walking ~19 km per week at 40–55% VO2peak) significantly increased cardiorespiratory fitness compared to sedentary individuals. Together these data indicate that exercise interventions decrease the risk or severity of CVD in subjects who are lean, obese, or have type 2 diabetes.

=== Cardiac rehabilitation ===
Exercise is also an important therapeutic treatment for patients who have cardiovascular diseases. A systematic review of 63 studies found that exercise-based cardiac rehabilitation improved cardiovascular function. These studies consisted of various forms of aerobic exercise at a range of intensities (from 50 to 95% VO2), over a multitude of time periods (1–47 months). Overall, exercise significantly reduced CVD-related mortality, decreased risk of MI, and improved quality of life. Another study looked specifically at patients with atherosclerosis post-revascularization surgery. Patients who underwent 60 min of exercise per day on a cycle ergometer for 4 weeks had an increased blood flow reserve (29%) and improved endothelium-dependent vasodilatation. A recent study provided personalized aerobic exercise rehabilitation programs for patients who had an acute myocardial infarction for 1 year after a coronary intervention surgery. The patients who underwent the exercise rehabilitation program had increased ejection fraction (60.81 vs. 53% control group), increased exercise tolerance, and reduced cardiovascular risk factors 6 months after starting the exercise rehabilitation program. This improvement in cardiovascular health in patients with atherosclerosis or post-MI is likely the result of increased myocardial perfusion in response to exercise, however, more research is required to fully understand these mechanisms.

One defining characteristic of heart failure is exercise intolerance, which resulted in a prescription for bed rest for these patients until the 1950s. However, it has now been shown that a monitored rehabilitation program using moderate-intensity exercise is safe for heart failure patients, and this has now become an important therapy for patients with heart failure. Meta-analyses and systemic reviews have shown that exercise training in heart failure patients is associated with improved quality of life, reduced risk of hospitalization and decreased rates of long-term mortality. One study of heart failure patients found that aerobic exercise (walking or cycling) at 60–70% of heart rate reserve 3–5 times per week for over 3 years led to improved health and overall quality of life (determined by a self-reported Kansas City Cardiomyopathy Questionnaire, a 23-question disease-specific questionnaire). Other studies have shown that exercise-based rehabilitation at a moderate intensity in heart failure patients improves cardiorespiratory fitness and increases both exercise endurance capacity and VO2max (12–31% increase).

More recent studies have examined the effects of high-intensity exercise on patients with heart failure. A recent study found that 12 weeks of high-intensity interval training (HIIT) in heart failure patients (with reduced ejection fraction) was well-tolerated and had similar benefits compared to patients who underwent moderate continuous exercise (MCE) training, including improved left ventricular remodeling and aerobic capacity. A separate study found that 4 weeks of HIIT in heart failure patients with preserved ejection fraction improved VO2peak and reduced diastolic dysfunction compared to both pre-training values and compared to the MCE group. These studies indicate that both moderate and high-intensity exercise training improve cardiovascular function in heart failure patients, likely related to increased endothelium-dependent vasodilation and improved aerobic capacity.

== Other benefits ==
=== Bones and muscles ===
Routine physical activity is important for building strong bones and muscles in children, but it is equally important for older adults. Bones and muscles work together to support daily movements. Physical activity strengthens muscles. Bones adapt by building more cells, and as a result, both become stronger. Strong bones and muscles protect against injury and improve balance and coordination. In addition, active adults experience less joint stiffness and improved flexibility. This becomes especially important with age, as it helps to prevent falls and the broken bones that may result. For those with arthritis, an exercise that keeps the muscles around the joint strong can act like a brace that will react to movement without the use of an actual brace.

=== Daily activity ===
The ability to perform daily activities and maintain independence requires strong muscles, balance, and endurance. Regular physical activity or exercise helps to improve and prevent the decline of muscle function, getting up out of a chair or leaning over to pick something up. Balance problems can reduce independence by interfering with activities of daily living. Regular physical activity can improve balance and reduce the risk of falling. Exercising regularly has many benefits for both your physical and mental health.

=== Cancer ===
Exercise increases the chances of surviving cancer. If one exercises during the early stages of cancer treatment it may allow time to reduce the detrimental side effects of the chemotherapy. It also improves physical functions along with reducing distress and fatigue. Studies have shown that exercise has the possibility to improve the chemotherapy drug uptake, thanks to the increase in peripheral circulation. This also makes changes to tumor vasculature from the increase of cardio and blood pressure.

=== Stroke ===
Regular physical activity and exercise decrease the risk of ischemic stroke and intracerebral hemorrhage. There is a dose-response relationship between increased physical activity and the risk of stroke. Being physically active before a stroke is associated with decreased admission stroke severity and improved post-stroke outcomes. Research indicates that individuals who engage in regular physical activity before experiencing a stroke demonstrate fewer stroke symptoms, smaller infarct volumes in ischemic strokes, smaller hematoma volumes in intracerebral hemorrhages, and higher post-stroke survival rates. Being physically active after a stroke is associated with improved recovery and function.

=== Sleep condition ===
Exercise triggers an increase in body temperature, and the post-exercise drop in temperature may promote falling asleep. Exercise may also reduce insomnia by decreasing arousal, anxiety, and depressive symptoms. Insomnia is commonly linked with elevated arousal, anxiety, and depression, and exercise has effects on reducing these symptoms in the general population. These issues count among the most common among most of the population. Anxiety disorders are the most common mental illness in the U.S., affecting 40 million adults in the United States age 18 and older, or 18.1% of the population every year. A 2010 review suggested that exercise generally improved sleep for most people, and may help with insomnia, but there is insufficient evidence to draw detailed conclusions about the relationship between exercise and sleep. A 2020 systematic review and meta-analysis suggested that physical activity has little association with sleep in healthy children. However, there have been several research findings indicating that certain forms of physical activity can improve the quality and duration of sleep. In fact, a 2019 study at The Federal University of São Paulo concluded that moderate physical activity resulted in an increase in sleep efficiency and duration in adults diagnosed with insomnia. The duration refers to the hours of sleep a person gets on a nightly basis, while the quality indicates how well or sufficient it was. Having poor sleep quality can lead to negative short-term consequences like emotional distress and performance deficits. The psychosocial issues associated with these consequences can vary between adults, adolescents, and children. Some of the long-term effects of poor sleep quality can lead to conditions like hypertension, metabolic syndrome, and even weight-related issues.

== Why This Matters ==
Sedentary behavior which is when a person doesn't exercise can cause many health risk factors. These can include accelerating biological aging, increase in risk of type 2 diabetes, and increase in risk of kidney failure. Sedentary behavior also puts an increased strain on the cardiovascular system, causes your heart and lungs to be less effecient, and causes a higher risk of developing HFpEF. Finally, sedentary behavior causes a higher risk of depression, causes a lower mental well-being, and can cause more depressive symptoms.

== See also ==
- International Charter of Physical Education, Physical Activity and Sport
