= UNESCO-CHIC BIRUP =

International development initiative

UNESCO-CHIC Group (China) Biosphere Rural and Urbanization Programme (UNESCO-CHIC BIRUP) is listed as UNESCO global demonstration programme.

BIRUP's aim is to narrow the gap between rural and urban areas by redefining the relationship and realizing the sustainable development of an integrated urban and rural economy, society, environment, culture, and education. BIRUP uses the market as the guide and high quality agricultural education and science development as the engine to promote industry linkages to balance production, ecology, and life. The programme seeks to implement a new concept to integrate urban and rural development known as ‘town in the rural, rural in the city’. BIRUP attempts to solve Chinese three-rural issues from the origin.
