= Go Heritage Run =

- Formation: 2014
- Founder: Ajay Reddy
- Type: Private
- Headquarters: Bangalore, India
- Location: Worldwide
- Official language: English
- Website: www.goheritagerun.com

Go Heritage Runs is a series of fun runs organized across India at various heritage locations. It was founded by GoUNESCO founder Ajay Reddy in 2014. The goal of these runs is to promote awareness of heritage locations.

== History ==
Go Heritage Runs began as an offshoot of GoUNESCO in 2014.

The run format of Go Heritage Runs is simple. These runs are conducted at heritage sites and are not time bound. They are organized on a Sunday and include different run formats such as 5K, 10K, up to the distance of a half marathon (21.0975 km). The exact run distances vary from location to location.

The preparation for these runs began in July 2014 in Hampi, where a test run was arranged. About 50 people traveled from Bangalore, Hyderabad, Mumbai and Chennai, to participate in the run. In November 2014, the next test run was conducted in Bidar.

On 27 January 2015, a full-fledged run was organized in Hampi, Karnataka which saw a decent turnout of runners traveling from a number of Indian cities. Through the rest of the year, heritage runs were conducted in cities such as Hyderabad, Ooty, Udaipur and lesser known heritage sites such as Bidar, Badami and Warangal

Conde Nast Traveller recognized 3 of Go Heritage Runs in its list of top scenic marathons in India.
