= Botany 2000 =

Botany 2000 is the name for a scientific programme, organized under the auspices of UNESCO. While a similar UNESCO programme, ASOMPS, focuses on the promotion of collaboration and co-operation between scientists in Asia, Botany 2000 is composed of activities in Asia and Africa. Activities in Europe are confined to support of herbaria in countries in transition and reconstruction e.g. Georgia.

The Botany 2000 programme was accepted by the UNESCO General Conference in 1989.

Activities in Africa and Asia subsume activities in predecessor networks such as the:

- Botany 2000-Asia
- Botany 2000-Africa

The Botany 2000-Asia programme is the new name for the former Southeast Asian Cooperative Program on Descriptive Botany (SEABOP) and for the work being carried out by the majority of the other organizations involved in the Asian Coordinating Group for Chemistry (ACGC).

Botany 2000-Asia is implemented by UNESCO's New Delhi Office and focuses on the taxonomy, and biological and cultural diversity of medicinal and ornamental plants, and their protection against environmental pollution, as well as ethnobiological classification and biological systematics and the correct documentation of useful plants through collection of voucher specimens. Within the framework of the project Botany 2000-Asia, UNESCO supports also the computerization of holdings and locations in herbaria throughout Asia.

Under the Botany 2000-Asia programme some conferences were held:

- Botany 2000-Asia: Herbarium Curation Workshop (15-20 October 1990, Point Walter, Bicton, Western Australia)
- Botany 2000-Asia: Zingiberaceae Workshop (15-18 October 1991, Hat Yai, Thailand)
- Botany 2000-Asia: Rutaceae Workshop (2-7 February 1992, in conjunction with ASOMPS VII, Manila, Philippines)
- Botany 2000-Asia: International Botanical Congress (28 August-3 September 1993, Tokyo, Japan)
- Botany 2000-Asia: International Seminar and Workshop : taxonomy and phytochemistry of the Asclepiadaceae in tropical Asia (June 1994, Malacca, Malaysia)
- Second Symposium on The Family Zingiberaceae (9-12 May 1995, Guangzhou, China)
- Botany 2000-Asia: Workshop on the Family Apocynaceae (6-8 February 1996, Chittagong, Bangladesh)

Neville Marchant, Director of the Western Australian Herbarium in Perth, has been involved in the Botany 2000-Asia programme since its inception.

The UNESCO Office, New Delhi also published the Botany 2000-Asia Newsletter four times a year. A typical issue contains news on workshops, training courses, databases, projects and forthcoming meetings as well as reports on unauthorized collection and export of medicinal plants from the region. The editor requests one to two page articles and reports of seminars and meetings of general relevance to botany and ethnobotany in Asia. Apart from producing the newsletter, the UNESCO Botany 2000-Asia programme sponsors occasional workshops on the taxonomy, ethnobotany and chemistry of various plant families, as well as training courses in herbarium techniques and curation.

Botany 2000-Africa is implemented by UNESCO's Nairobi Office and deals with the conservation and use of the medicinal flora of Africa.

Some of the activities of the Botany 2000-Africa programme are published in: S. Edwards and Z. Asfaw (Editors): The Status of Some Plant Resources in Parts of Tropical Africa. Botany 2000: East and Central Africa; NAPRECA Monograph Series No. 2. Published by Natural Products Research Network for Eastern and Central Africa (NAPRECA), Addis Ababa University, Addis Ababa, 1992.

The UNESCO Botany 2000 programme is different from the annual meeting of the Botanical Society of America (BSA), which organised an annual scientific conference named Botany. This Botany 2000 : New Frontiers in Botany conference was held in Portland, Oregon on 6-10 August 2000.
