= World Declaration on Higher Education =

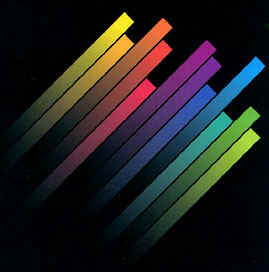
world declaration

The World Declaration on Higher Education for the Twenty-First Century: Vision and Action was adopted by UNESCO's World Conference on Higher Education on 9 October 1998, with the aim of setting global standards on the ideals and accessibility of higher education.
