= World Metrology Day =

Annual celebration of SI units

World Metrology Day is an event occurring on 20 May celebrating the International System of Units. The date is the anniversary of the signing of the Metre Convention in 1875. Metrology is the study of measurement.

The World Metrology Day project is currently realized jointly by the BIPM and the OIML.

== 2019 ==
The 2019 Metrology Day is when the changes to the International System that were decided on in 2018 come into effect, among them the replacement of the International Prototype of the Kilogram with a redefinition based on the Planck constant.

== 2023 ==
World Metrology Day adopted as one of UNESCO international days.
