= Mustafa Shehu =

Nigerian engineer

President of the World Federation of Engineering Organizations
- Incumbent
- Assumed office October 2023
- Preceded by: José Manuel Vieira

Personal details
- Born: Mustafa Balarabe Shehu

Mustafa Balarabe Shehu is a Nigerian electrical engineer and 17th president of the World Federation of Engineering Organizations. In 2023, he became the first person from Sub-Sahara Africa to be elected president of the engineering organization.

== Life ==
Shehu was born on April 12, 1963, in Kano, Nigeria. He graduated with a Bachelor of Engineering in Electrical Engineering from Ahmadu Bello University.

He began his professional journey at Egbin Thermal Station in Lagos. He later joined the Kano State Rural Electricity Board as a Senior Engineer and eventually became the assistant director in 1998. Subsequently, he co-founded MBS Engineering Limited with his colleagues, which specializes in providing electrical and mechanical engineering services.

Between 2012 and 2013, he was the 28th President of the Nigerian Society of Engineers, and from 2015 to 2016, he served as President of the Federation of African Engineering Organisations.

Sheu was elected as the President-Elect of the World Federation of Engineering Organizations during the General Assembly of the Federation in San José, Costa Rica in March 2022. Later, in October 2023, he assumed the position of President of WFEO during the General Assembly held in Prague, Czech Republic.
