= Treatment of mental disorders =

- Specialty: Psychiatry and clinical psychology

Mental disorders are classified as psychological conditions marked primarily by sufficient disorganization of personality, mind, and emotions to seriously impair the normal psychological and often social functioning of the individual. The DSM-5-TR defines mental disorders as syndromes arising from dysfunction in relevant biopsychosocial processes that results in significant disturbances in behavioral responses, emotional regulation, and other cognitive processes. Mental disorders may consist of several affective, behavioral, cognitive and perceptual components, and may impede the individual from functioning normally in society. The acknowledgement and understanding of mental health conditions have changed over time and across cultures; however, stigmatization still persists. There are also significant discrepancies in the diagnosis and treatment of mental disorders across various social, racial and gender groups. There are still variations in the definition, classification, and treatment of mental disorders.

== History ==
As society's attitudes towards mental illnesses have substantially changed throughout the years, so have the methods of treatment. Many early treatments for mental illness have since been deemed ineffective and even dangerous. Some of these earlier treatments included trephination and bloodletting. Trephination refers to the process of drilling a small hole into the patient's skull in an attempt to 'let out demons', reflecting an earlier religious and cultural belief that mental disorders were demonic in nature. Bloodletting is when a certain amount of blood is drained out of a person due to the belief that chemical imbalances result in mental disorders. Both treatments were dangerous and ineffective. Similarly, herbs and sexual abstinence were frequently prescribed to women for cases of hysteria as this was believed to be an exclusively female disease until Freud.

During the 17th century, however, it became common for individuals with mental disorders to be locked away in institutions due to a lack of knowledgeable treatment options. Mental institutions became the main treatment for a long period of time. Through years of research and medical developments, safe and effective treatments both psychologically and pharmacologically have become available to patients. Early glimpses of the treatment of mental illness included dunking in cold water by Samuel Willard (physician), who reportedly established the first American hospital for mental illness. The history of treatment of mental disorders consists of a development through years, mainly in both psychotherapy (Cognitive therapy, Behavior therapy, Group Therapy, and ECT) and psychopharmacology (drugs used in mental disorders).

Different perspectives on the causes of psychological disorders also continued to arise. Some scholars believed that psychological disorders are caused by specific abnormalities of the brain and nervous system. This perspective reflected the principle that they should be approached for treatment in the same way as physical illness, a belief that initially arose from Hippocrates.

Psychotherapy is a relatively new method used in the treatment of mental disorders. The practice of individual psychotherapy as a treatment of mental disorders is about 100 years old. Sigmund Freud (1856–1939) was the first to introduce this concept in psychoanalysis. Cognitive behavioral therapy is a more recent therapy that was founded in the 1960s by Aaron T. Beck, an American psychiatrist. It is a more systematic and structured part of psychotherapy. It consists of helping the patient learn effective ways to overcome their problems and difficulties that cause them distress. Behavior therapy has its roots in experimental psychology. E.L. Thorndike and B.F. Skinner was among the first to work on behavior therapy.

Convulsive therapy was introduced by Ladislas Meduna in 1934. He induced seizures through a series of injections as a means to attempt to treat schizophrenia. Meanwhile, in Italy, Ugo Cerletti substituted injections with electricity. Because of this substitution, the new theory was called electroconvulsive therapy (ECT).

Besides psychotherapy, a wide range of medications are used in the treatment of mental disorders. The first drugs used for this purpose were extracted from plants with psychoactive properties. Louis Lewin, in 1924, was the first to introduce a classification of drugs and plants that had properties of this kind. The history of the medications used in mental disorders has developed a lot over the years. The discovery of modern drugs prevailed during the 20th century. Lithium, a mood stabilizer, was discovered as a treatment of mania by John F. Cade in 1949, and Hammond (1871) used lithium bromide for 'acute mania with depression'". In 1937, Daniel Bovet and Anne-Marie Staub discovered the first antihistamine. In 1951, Paul Charpentier synthesized chlorpromazine an antipsychotic.

== Influences ==
Several practitioners have influenced the treatment of modern mental disorders. During the 18th century in Philippe Pinel, a French physician, helped/advocate for better treatment of patients with mental disorders. Similar to Pinel, Benjamin Rush, a Philadelphian physician, believed patients just needed time away from the stresses of modern life. Which he believed was the cause of mental disorders to develop. Benjamin Rush(1746–1813) was considered the Father of American Psychiatry for his many works and studies in the mental health field. He tried to classify different types of mental disorders, he theorized about their causes, and tried to find possible cures for them. Rush believed that mental disorders were caused by poor blood circulation, though he was wrong. He also described Savant Syndrome and had an approach to addictions.

Other important early psychiatrists include George Parkman, Oliver Wendell Holmes Sr., George Zeller, Carl Jung, Leo Kanner, and Peter Breggin. George Parkman (1790–1849) got his medical degree at the University of Aberdeen in Scotland. He was influenced by Benjamin Rush, who inspired him to take an interest in the state asylums. He trained at the Parisian Asylum. Parkman wrote several papers on treatment for the mentally ill. Oliver Wendell Holmes Sr.(1809–1894) was an American Physician who wrote many famous writings on medical treatments. George Zeller (1858–1938) was famous for his way of treating the mentally ill. He believed they should be treated like people and did so in a caring manner. He banned narcotics, mechanical restraints, and imprisonment while he was in charge at Peoria State Asylum. Peter Breggin (1939–present) disagrees with the practices of harsh psychiatry such as electroconvulsive therapy.

== Classification ==
German Physician Emil Kraepelin was more interested in the causes of mental disorders and potential classifications rather than focusing on and attempting to treat symptoms of mental disorders. This led to the classification of manic depression and Schizophrenia, as well as the start of a framework for classifying other disorders. However, this method of research/work was ignored until the need for a universal classification system arose. This need would later lead to the creation of the DSM. This not only provided classification of mental disorders but also helped to understand where to start in terms of treatment.

== Psychotherapy ==
A form of treatment for many mental disorders is psychotherapy. Psychotherapy is an interpersonal intervention, usually provided by a mental health professional such as a clinical psychologist, that employs any of a range of specific psychological techniques. There are several main types. Cognitive behavioral therapy (CBT) is used for a wide variety of disorders, based on modifying the patterns of thought and behavior associated with a particular disorder. There are various kinds of CBT therapy, and offshoots such as dialectical behavior therapy. Psychoanalysis, addressing underlying psychic conflicts and defences, has been a dominant school of psychotherapy and is still in use. Systemic therapy or family therapy is sometimes used, addressing a network of relationships as well as individuals themselves. Some psychotherapies are based on a humanistic approach. Some therapies are for a specific disorder only, for example, interpersonal and social rhythm therapy. Mental health professionals often pick and choose techniques, employing an eclectic or integrative approach tailored to a particular disorder and individual. Much may depend on the therapeutic relationship, and there may be issues of trust, confidentiality and engagement.

To regulate the potentially powerful influences of therapies, psychologists hold themselves to a set of ethical standers for the treatment of people with mental disorders, written by the American Psychological Association. These ethical standards include:

- Striving to benefit clients and taking care to do no harm;
- Establishing relationships of trust with clients;
- Promoting accuracy, honesty, and truthfulness;
- Seeking fairness in treatment and taking precautions to avoid biases;
- Respecting the dignity and worth of all people.

== Medication ==
Psychiatric medication is also widely used to treat mental disorders. These are licensed psychoactive drugs usually prescribed by a psychiatrist or family doctor. There are several main groups. Antidepressants are used for the treatment of clinical depression as well as often for anxiety and other disorders. Anxiolytics are used, generally short-term, for anxiety disorders and related problems such as physical symptoms and insomnia. Mood stabilizers are used primarily in bipolar disorder, mainly targeting mania rather than depression. Antipsychotics are used for psychotic disorders, notably in schizophrenia. However, they are also often used to treat bipolar disorder in smaller doses to treat anxiety. Stimulants are commonly used, notably for ADHD.

Despite the different conventional names of the drug groups, there can be considerable overlap in the kinds of disorders for which they are actually indicated. There may also be off-label use. There can be problems with adverse effects and adherence. Differences in the frequency of the prescription of medication for treatment of mental disorders exist along social, racial, and gender lines, with marginalized groups being medicated at higher rates. These discrepancies are particularly pronounced in lower socioeconomic status groups and women. This over-reliance on medication as a form of treatment can be harmful to the affected populations, with outcomes such as the potential for addiction, side effects, and recreational misuse.

=== Antipsychotics ===
In addition of atypical antipsychotics in cases of inadequate response to antidepressant therapy is an increasingly popular strategy that is well supported in the literature, though these medications may result in greater discontinuation due to adverse events. Aripiprazole was the first drug approved by the US Food and Drug Administration for adjunctive treatment of MDD in adults with inadequate response to antidepressant therapy in the current episode. Recommended doses of aripiprazole range from 2 mg/d to 15 mg/d based on 2 large, multicenter randomized, double-blind, placebo-controlled studies, which were later supported by a third large trial. Most conventional antipsychotics, such as the phenothiazines, work by blocking the D2 Dopamine receptors. Atypical antipsychotics, such as clozapine block both the D2 Dopamine receptors as well as 5HT2A serotonin receptors. Atypical antipsychotics are favored over conventional antipsychotics because they reduce the prevalence of pseudoparkinsonism which causes tremors and muscular rigidity similar to Parkinson's disease. The most severe side effect of antipsychotics is agranulocytosis, a depression of white blood cell count with unknown cause, and some patients may also experience photosensitivity. Atypical and conventional antipsychotics also differ in the fact that atypical medications help with both positive and negative symptoms while conventional medications only help with the positive symptoms; negative symptoms being things that are taken away from the person such as a reduction in motivation, while positive symptoms are things being added such as seeing illusions.

=== Antidepressant ===
Early antidepressants were discovered through research on treating tuberculosis and yielded the class of antidepressants known as monoamine oxidase inhibitors (MAO). Only two MAO inhibitors remain on the market in the United States because they alter the metabolism of the dietary amino acid tyramine which can lead to a hypertensive crisis. Research on improving phenothiazine antipsychotics led to the development of tricyclic antidepressants which inhibit synaptic uptake of the neurotransmitters norepinephrine and serotonin. SSRIs or selective serotonin reuptake inhibitors are the most frequently used antidepressant. These drugs share many similarities with the tricyclic antidepressants but are more selective in their action. The greatest risk of the SSRIs is an increase in violent and suicidal behavior, particularly in children and adolescents. In 2006 antidepressant sales worldwide totaled US$15 billion and over 226 million prescriptions were given.

== Research on the effects of physical activity on mental illness ==
=== Research completed ===
As increasing evidence of the benefits of physical activity has become apparent, research on the mental benefits of physical activity has been examined. While it was originally believed that physical activity only slightly benefits mood and mental state, overtime positive mental effects from physical activity became more pronounced. Scientists began completing studies, which were often highly problematic due to problems such as getting patients to complete their trials, controlling for all possible variables, and finding adequate ways to test progress. Data were often collected through case and population studies, allowing for less control, but still gathering observations. More recently studies have begun to have more established methods in an attempt to start to comprehend the benefits of different levels and amounts of fitness across multiple age groups, genders, and mental illnesses. Some psychologists are recommending fitness to patients, however the majority of doctors are not prescribing patients with a full program.

=== Results ===
Many early studies show that physical activity has positive effects on subjects with mental illness. Most studies have shown that higher levels of exercise correlate to improvement in mental state, especially for depression. On the other hand, some studies have found that exercise can have a beneficial short-term effect at lower intensities. Demonstrating that lower intensity sessions with longer rest periods produced significantly higher positive affect and reduced anxiety when measured shortly after. Physical activity was found to be beneficial regardless of age and gender. Some studies found exercise to be more effective at treating depression than medication over long periods of time, but the most effective treatment of depression was exercise in combination with antidepressants. Exercise appeared to have the greatest effect on mental health a short period of time after exercise. Different studies have found this time to be from twenty minutes to several hours. Patients who have added exercise to other treatments tend to have more consistent long lasting relief from symptoms than those who just take medication. No single regimented workout has been agreed upon as most effective for any mental illness at this time. The exercise programs prescribed are mostly intended to get patients doing some form of physical activity, as the benefits of doing any form of exercise have been proven to be better than doing nothing at all.

== Other ==
Electroconvulsive therapy (known as ECT) is when electric currents are applied to someone with a mental disorder who is not responding well to other forms of therapy. Psychosurgery, including deep brain stimulation, is another available treatment for some disorders. This form of therapy is disputed in many cases on its ethicality and effectiveness.

Creative therapies are sometimes used, including music therapy, art therapy or drama therapy. Each form of these therapy involves performing, creating, listening to, observing, or being a part of the therapeutic act.

Lifestyle adjustments and supportive measures are often used, including peer support, self-help and supported housing or employment. Some advocate dietary supplements. A placebo effect may play a role.

== Services ==
Mental health services may be based in hospitals, clinics or the community. Often an individual may engage in different treatment modalities and use various mental health services. These may be under case management (sometimes referred to as "service coordination"), use inpatient or day treatment. Patients can utilize a psychosocial rehabilitation program or take part in an assertive community treatment program. Providing optimal treatments earlier in the course of a mental health disorder may prevent further relapses and ongoing disability. This has led to a new early intervention in psychosis service approach for psychosis Some approaches are based on a recovery model of mental disorder, and may focus on challenging stigma and social exclusion and creating empowerment and hope.

=== Disparities in access to mental health treatment ===
In America, half of people with severe symptoms of a mental health condition were found to have received no treatment in the prior 12 months. Fear of disclosure, rejection by friends, and ultimately discrimination are a few reasons why people with mental health conditions often don't seek help.

Sociocultural factors also play a role in impacting access to mental health treatment services by population. Specifically, lower socioeconomic status groups exhibit higher unmet needs for mental health treatment. Moreover, socioeconomic status has been correlated with frequency of various types of treatment as well, with those of lower socioeconomic status being more frequently prescribed strictly medication rather than psychotherapy even in similar case circumstances. Differences in care rates by socioeconomic status persist despite controlling for other factors such as mental disorder base rate, thus reflecting a discrepancy of access rather than need.

In addition to socioeconomic status, there are also gender disparities in the treatment of mental disorders. Women have been historically misdiagnosed with psychiatric disorders at higher rates, and are prescribed medication for anxiety and depression more frequently even when controlling for factors such as frequency of visits. Men also seek treatment for mental disorders at lower rates, despite similar need.

There is also discrepancies in treatment of mental disorders by geographic region. The UK is moving towards paying mental health providers by the outcome results that their services achieve. For Depressive Disorders specifically, treatment rates in youth were higher in the Americas than in Europe and the West Pacific. However, within the Americas, treatment of Anxiety and Depressive Disorders was less common than treatment of other behavioral disorders such as ADHD, with an even more pronounced lack of treatment in lower income families.

== Stigmas and treatment ==
Stigma against mental disorders can lead people with mental health conditions not to seek help. Two types of mental health stigmas include social stigma and perceived stigma. Though separated into different categories, the two can interact with each other, where prejudicial attitudes in social stigma lead to the internalization of discriminatory perceptions in perceived stigma.

The stigmatization of mental illnesses can elicit stereotypes, some common ones including violence, incompetence, and blame. However, the manifestation of that stereotype into prejudice may not always occur. When it does, prejudice leads to discrimination, the behavioral reaction.

Public stigmas may also harm social opportunities. Prejudice frequently disallows people with mental illnesses from finding suitable housing or procuring good jobs. Studies have shown that stereotypes and prejudice about mental illness have harmful impacts on obtaining and keeping good jobs. This, along with other negative effects of stigmatization have led researchers to conduct studies on the relationship between public stigma and care seeking. Researchers have found that an inverse relationship exists between public stigma and care seeking, as well as between stigmatizing attitudes and treatment adherence. Furthermore, specific beliefs that may influence people not to seek treatment have been identified, one of which is concern over what others might think.

The internalization of stigmas may lead to self-prejudice which in turn can lead a person to experience negative emotional reactions, interfering with a person's quality of life. Research has shown a significant relationship between shame and avoiding treatment. A study measuring this relationship found that research participants who expressed shame from personal experiences with mental illnesses were less likely to participate in treatment. Additionally, family shame is also a predictor of avoiding treatment. Research showed that people with psychiatric diagnoses were more likely to avoid services if they believed family members would have a negative reaction to said services. Hence, public stigma can influence self-stigma, which has been shown to decrease treatment involvement. As such, the interaction between the two constructs impact care seeking.

== List of treatments ==
- Somatotherapy (type of pharmacotherapy; biology-based treatments)
  - Psychiatric medications (psychoactive drugs used in psychiatry)
    - Antianxiety drugs (anxiolytics)
    - Antidepressant drugs
    - Antipsychotic drugs
    - Mood stabilizers
  - Shock therapy also known as convulsive therapies
    - Insulin shock therapy (no longer practiced)
    - Electroconvulsive therapy
  - Psychosurgery
    - Leukotomy (prefrontal lobotomy; no longer practiced)
    - Bilateral cingulotomy
    - Deep brain stimulation
- Psychotherapy (psychology-based treatment)
  - Cognitive behavioral therapy
  - Psychoanalysis
  - Gestalt therapy
  - Interpersonal psychotherapy
  - EMDR
  - Behavior therapy
