= UNESCO World Engineering Day for Sustainable Development =

UNESCO Engineering Day

The World Engineering Day for Sustainable Development (acronym: WED) is one of the UNESCO international days and is celebrated every 4 March. It was proclaimed by UNESCO General Conference on 25 November 2019, based on a proposal by the World Federation of Engineering Organizations (WFEO).

It is celebrated by major engineering professional institutions, such as the Institution of Civil Engineers, the China Association for Science and Technology, Engineers Canada, Engineers Australia, Ingénieurs et scientifiques de France, as well as NGOs such as DiscoverE, Engineers Without Borders, universities such as Imperial College London or Technische Hochschule Georg Agricola and corporations supporting the event.

The first edition of WED in 2019, as well as the following ones, were based on the concept of holding simultaneous online and on-site celebrations, hosted by UNESCO, WFEO, engineering institutions members of WFEO, as well as generating social media trends and messages on the theme of event, engaging with UN agencies such as UNEP, corporate bodies, other associations, media and students.

In 2022, the concept extended to a 24-hour streaming hosted by WFEO, live streaming featured celebrations in various regions of the world.

Since 2022, the celebration includes global events such as an international hackathon competition for engineering students in relations to sustainable development matters.
