= Paul Jowitt =

British civil engineer

Professor Paul William Jowitt CBE FREng FRSE FICE
- Education: Imperial College London
- Known for: 145th President of the ICE (Institution of Civil Engineers)
- Awards: International Water Association Prize: Research Excellence in Support of Sustainable Urban Water Management (2008); ASCE Best Paper Prize Journal of Computing in Civil Engineering (2007); ICE Trevithick Prize (2005); ICE Trevithick Premium (1987) FREng (2012)

Paul William Jowitt is a British civil engineer, Professor of Civil Engineering Systems at Heriot Watt University, and executive director of the Scottish Institute of Sustainable Technology. On 3 November 2009, he became the 145th President of the Institution of Civil Engineers. He was made a Commander of the Order of the British Empire (CBE) in the 2011 Birthday Honours for services to technology. He is currently President of the Commonwealth Engineers Council. He was elected in 2012 as a Fellow of the Royal Academy of Engineering.

Jowitt graduated from Imperial College in 1972, and lectured there from 1974 before moving to Heriot-Watt University in 1987 where he was head of civil and offshore engineering from 1989 to 1999. In 1997 he was an Erskine Fellow at the University of Canterbury, New Zealand. He was elected a Fellow of the Royal Society of Edinburgh in 2005.

He was the lead investigator in a Heriot-Watt/Cambridge University consortium on the EPSRC-funded Implementation Strategies for Sustainable Urban Environment Systems (ISSUES) project, intended to facilitate knowledge transfer for EPSRC's Sustainable Urban Environments Programme. Previously he led a number of research projects from EPSRC, UKWIR and the UK Water Utilities on water distribution network reliability, drought management and sustainable wastewater treatment.

His published work includes journal articles in Proceedings of the Institution of Civil Engineers - Engineering Sustainability, Journal of Water Resources Planning and Management, ASCE, Engineering Optimization. and Civil Engineering and Environmental Systems (which Jowitt edits).

Jowitt is chair of the engineering charity 'Engineers Against Poverty'. He is a former trustee of the Forth Bridges Visitor Centre, and a trustee of The Steamship Sir Walter Scott Trust.

Professional and academic associations
Preceded by Jean Venables	President of the Institution of Civil Engineers; November 2009– November 2010	Succeeded by Peter Hansford
