= GoUNESCO =

- Formation: 2012
- Founder: Ajay Reddy
- Founded at: Hyderabad, India
- Type: Private
- Headquarters: Bangalore, India
- Location: Worldwide
- Official language: English
- Website: www.gounesco.com

GoUNESCO is an umbrella of initiatives that help promote awareness and provide tools for laypersons to engage with heritage. GoUNESCO was created by Ajay Reddy in 2012. It is supported by UNESCO, New Delhi.

== History ==
GoUNESCO began when Ajay Reddy saw a tweet posted by Pallavi Savant of a photo from a World Heritage Site and asked how many people had been to the heritage sites whose photographs were printed at the back of the entry pass. Ajay Reddy realized that he himself was not aware of half the places. He took it upon himself as a challenge and in 2012, he visited 9 out of the then 28 World Heritage Sites in India.

== Travel challenges ==
Participants can choose to participate in different country challenges such as the GoUNESCO India Challenge, GoUNESCO Germany Challenge, GoUNESCO South Africa Challenge. Everyone automatically is enrolled into the lifetime challenges - GoUNESCO Culture Challenge and the GoUNESCO Epic Challenge. A country-specific challenge such as The India Challenge mandates participants to visit all the World Heritage Sites located in India within one calendar year. The first person who visits all the world heritage sites, or the person with the most points at the end of the year, wins the challenge.

There are 316 intangible cultural heritage elements listed in the UNESCO list of Intangible Cultural Heritage in Need of Urgent Safeguarding and The Representative List of the Intangible Cultural Heritage of Humanity. Every participant entering the Cultural Challenge has to experience cultural heritage elements and capture proofs in the form of pictures, videos and personal notes. Every proof of experiencing an intangible cultural heritage element can earn them points and, in turn enable them to learn about the unique aspects of cultures from across the world. The Epic Challenge, like The Culture Challenge is a lifetime challenge – meaning all the proofs from a participant's travel any time will be eligible even if a participant takes a lifetime to visit all the 1,031 Heritage Sites in the world. Jai Bharathi was the winner of the first ever travel challenge.

== Go Heritage Runs ==
Go Heritage Runs began as an offshoot of GoUNESCO in 2014. These fun runs have been organized at famous World Heritage Sites such as Hampi, and Ooty, Udaipur and lesser known heritage sites such as Bidar, Warangal and Badami.

== Student program ==
In January 2014, GoUNESCO started a student program in which students are chosen from throughout the world through an open application process. The 6 month program is held in two sessions every year - January through June and July through December. Once chosen, the students are assigned fun tasks that help them explore and at the same time, build awareness of heritage around them.

== 'Make Heritage Fun' campaigns ==
In June 2015, GoUNESCO started #makeheritagefun as a distributed series of events and distributed social media campaigns occurring simultaneously at cities around the world to draw attention to heritage. This initiative by GoUNESCO is yet another way for laypersons to engage with heritage. Experiences from across the world will be collated and amplified through social media using the hashtag #makeheritagefun.

== Awards and recognitions ==
- Awarded Special Recognition by the Digital Empowerment Foundation, India
- Commended by the German National Commission for UNESCO and the South African Heritage Research Association
- GoUNESCO is an associate partner with EU Heritage Tour project, a European Commission funded project to encourage tourism to world heritage sites in Italy, Austria, Portugal, Cyprus and Netherlands.
