= International Charter of Physical Education, Physical Activity and Sport =

UNESCO charter promoting access to sport

- Type: International Charter
- Drafted: 4 November 2014
- Location: France，Paris
- Effective: 18 November 2015
- Depositary: UNESCO
- Languages: Arabic, Chinese, English, French, Russian, and Spanish
- http://www.unesco.org/new/en/social-and-human-sciences/themes/physical-education-and-sport/sport-charter/

The International Charter of Physical Education, Physical Activity and Sport is a rights-based document which was adopted by member states of the United Nations Educational, Scientific and Cultural Organization (UNESCO), on 18 November 2015 during the 38th session of the UNESCO General Conference. This document is the legitimate successor of the International Charter of Physical Education and Sport, originally adopted in 1978, during the 20th General Conference of UNESCO.

The original Charter, which was amended in 1991, was the first rights-based document to state that "the practice of physical education and sport is a fundamental right for all". Based on the universal spirit of the original Charter (1978), and integrating the significant evolutions in the field of sport over the last 37 years, the revised Sport Charter highlights the health benefits of physical activity, the inclusion of persons with disabilities, the protection of children, the role of sport for development and peace, as well as the need to protect the integrity of sport from doping, violence, manipulation and corruption.

== Objectives ==
In twelve brief articles, the revised Charter serves as a universal reference on the ethical and quality standards of physical education, physical activity and sport. While preserving the initial intention of the 1978 Charter, this new document also represents a renewed commitment of the international sports community to actively promote sport as a catalyst for peace and development.

The revised version of the Sport Charter provides a framework that orients the protection of the integrity of sport and supports broader policies in favour of grassroots sport. It also recognizes physical education as a driver for promoting gender equality, social inclusion, non-discrimination and sustained dialogue in our societies.

UNESCO Director-General, Irina Bokova said: "The adoption of the revised Charter should mark a shift away from words towards action, from policy intent to implementation. It sets the tone for a new international sport policy debate, which should now focus on the exchange of good practice, education and training programmes, capacity development, and advocacy. This is also a strong recognition of physical education as a driver for promoting gender equality, social inclusion, non-discrimination and sustained dialogue in our societies".

== Contents ==
The International Charter of Physical Education, Physical Activity and Sport contains a preamble and 12 articles. These are the main values defended by the Charter:

=== Access to sport as a fundamental right for all ===
Article 1 - The practice of physical education, physical activity and sport is a fundamental right for all

=== The values and benefits of sport ===
Article 2 - Physical education, physical activity and sport can yield a wide range of benefits to individuals, communities and society at large

Article 11 - Physical education, physical activity and sport can play an important role in the realization of development, peace and post-conflict and post-disaster objectives

=== Quality and ethical principles ===
Article 4 - Physical education, physical activity and sport programmes must inspire lifelong participation.

Article 5 – All stakeholders must ensure that their activities are economically, socially and environmentally sustainable.

Article 6 - Research, evidence and evaluation are indispensable components for the development of physical education, physical activity and sport.

Article 7 - Teaching, coaching and administration of physical education, physical activity and sport must be performed by qualified personnel.

Article 8 - Adequate and safe spaces, facilities and equipment are essential to quality physical education, physical activity and sport.

Article 9 - Safety and the management of risk are necessary conditions of quality provision.

Article 10 - Protection and promotion of the integrity and ethical values of physical education, physical activity and sport must be a constant concern for all

=== The roles of different stakeholders ===
Article 3 – All stakeholders must participate in creating a strategic vision, identifying policy positions and priorities.

Article 12 – International cooperation is a prerequisite for enhancing the scope and impact of physical education, physical activity and sport.

== Applications ==
The Quality Physical Education Policy Project illustrates how principles and recommendations stipulated in the Charter can be translated into indicators, benchmarks and tools.

== Authors of the Revision ==
The revision of the Charter involved experts and practitioners from governments, sports organizations, academia and NGOs. This new version was carefully examined through sessions of the Intergovernmental Committee for Physical Education and Sport (CIGEPS) and its Permanent Consultative Council (PCC), as well as UNESCO’s Executive Board. It is a follow-up to the Declaration of Berlin that was adopted by 600 participants from 121 countries, as an outcome of the 5th World Conference of Sport Ministers (MINEPS V).

=== MINEPS ===
Created in 1976, the International Conference of Ministers and Senior Officials Responsible for Physical Education and Sport (MINEPS) is a forum that facilitates intellectual and technical exchange in the field of physical education and sport. MINEPS also serves as an institutional mechanism for a coherent international strategy in this domain. It is also the only global platform that engages governments, intergovernmental organizations, the sport movement, academia and specialized NGOs.

=== CIGEPS ===
The Intergovernmental Committee for Physical Education and Sport (CIGEPS) was established in 1978 to promote the role and value of sport and its inclusion in public policy. CIGEPS is composed of expert representatives in the field of physical education and sport from 18 UNESCO Member States, each elected for a four-year term. In 2015, CIGEPS is composed of the 18 following member states of UNESCO:

- Azerbaijan
- Brazil
- Colombia
- Congo
- Denmark
- Germany
- Indonesia
- Iran
- Madagascar
- Malaysia
- Mexico
- Oman
- Qatar
- Russia
- South Africa
- Turkey
- Ukraine
- Yemen

=== Permanent Consultative Council ===
The Permanent Consultative Council (PCC), comprising key sport federations, UN agencies and NGOs, provides technical support and advice to the CIGEPS.

- International Council of Sport Science and Physical Education (ICSSPE)
- International Olympic Committee (IOC)
- International Paralympic Committee (IPC)
- SportAccord
- United Nations Children’s Fund (UNICEF)
- United Nations Development Programme (UNDP)
- United Nations Environment Programme (UNEP)
- United Nations Global Compact Office
- United Nations Office on Sport for Development and Peace (UNOSDP)
- UN Women
- World Health Organization (WHO)
- Association of National Olympic Committees (ANOC)
- Fédération Internationale de Football Association (FIFA)
- Fédération Internationale de Natation (FINA)
- Fédération Internationale du Sport Universitaire (FISU)
- Havas Sports and Entertainment
- Institut de Relations Internationales et Stratégiques (IRIS)
- International Association of Athletic Federations (IAAF)
- International Biathlon Union (IBU)
- International Fair Play Committee
- International Pierre de Coubertin Committee
- International Working Group on Women and Sport
- Peace and Sport Organization
- PL4Y International
- Play the Game (NGO)
- Right to Play
- The Association for International Sport for All (TAFISA)
- World Anti-Doping Agency (WADA)
- World Federation of the Sporting Goods Industry (WFSGI)
