= African World Heritage Day =

Day observed by the United Nations

"Proclaimed by the 38th session of the General Conference of UNESCO (November 2015), African World Heritage Day is an opportunity for people around the world, and particularly Africans, to celebrate the Continent’s irreplaceable cultural and natural heritage."

According to UNESCO's news article, May 5, 2017 - African World Heritage Day, "Africa remains underrepresented on the World Heritage List." As of June 2023, Africa hosts 54 cultural sites, 39 natural sites, and 5 mixed (cultural & natural) sites for 98 total sites, or 8.47% of the 1157 total sites worldwide. Numerous problems "threaten the very characteristics for which a property was inscribed on the World Heritage List," including armed conflict and war, earthquakes and other natural disasters, pollution, poaching, uncontrolled urbanization, and unchecked tourist development. Worldwide, 55 sites are identified as "in danger," and 15 sites reside in Africa.

UNESCO is committed to spearheading international efforts to draw on the vast potential of Africa's cultural and natural heritage as a force for poverty reduction and social cohesion as well as a driver of sustainable development and innovation. Through this international day, UNESCO aims to increase global awareness of African heritage, with a special focus on youth, and to mobilise enhanced cooperation for its safeguarding on the local, regional and global level.

The Day was established to raise awareness of the immense potential of the African cultural and natural heritage. It also aims to alert the world to the vulnerability of this heritage: there are 21 African sites on the List of World Heritage in Danger.

The preservation and enhancement of this heritage are essential factors in sustainable development, the only kind of development capable of meeting the complex challenges that face Africa today and include climate change, the challenge of education and the economy, and rapid urbanization.

Mobilizing local communities, especially young people, around the safeguarding of the heritage, involving them in projects that place value on their cultural identity and natural environment, is one of the best ways of opening up prospects for the future and for development. It is in particular through training and education that this mobilization may eventually prove to be most effective.

== Challenges and development opportunities ==
African World Heritage Day is the ideal time to raise awareness among the general public about the urgent need to protect African heritage. Irina Bokova, Director-General of UNESCO, declared that "today more than 23 African sites are on the List of World Heritage in Danger (...); all are threatened and are at risk of disappearing if we do not act quickly. We each have a role to play."

Africa, the cradle of humanity, remains underrepresented on the World Heritage List with only 131 sites (12%, including 90 sites in Sub-Saharan Africa and 41 sites in North Africa) Yet the 23 African sites inscribed on the List of World Heritage in Danger account for 42% of all sites on the List. Heritage protection on the African continent faces numerous challenges such as armed conflict, terrorism, poaching and illicit trafficking, global warming and natural disasters, uncontrolled urban expansion, unregulated tourism, and mining and oil exploration.

In response to this situation, the Ngorongoro Declaration, which resulted from the first major international conference on African World Heritage (June 2016, Tanzania), affirms that sustainable development can ensure that appropriate efforts are deployed to protect endangered resources in Africa, making the safeguarding of heritage a driver for sustainable development. The Declaration also calls on "African States Parties to promote the role that women and youth play in the conservation and management of cultural and natural heritage".

== African World Heritage Regional Youth Forum ==
The African World Heritage Regional Youth Forum on "Increasing youth involvement in the promotion and protection of African World Heritage" took place at the Robben Island World Heritage Site in Cape Town from 28 April to 4 May 2016. The forum was organised by the African World Heritage Fund (AWHF) in partnership with the South African Government and the UNESCO World Heritage Centre and hosted by the Robben Island Museum. The participants included a total of 27 young individuals from 23 African countries – Botswana, Cameroon, Egypt, Ethiopia, The Gambia, Ghana, Kenya, Lesotho, Liberia, Malawi, Mauritius, Morocco, Mozambique, Namibia, Nigeria, Seychelles, South Africa, Sudan, Tanzania, Uganda, Zambia and Zimbabwe. In total, there were fourteen (14) females and thirteen (13) males.

The Forum was also attended by various dignitaries including the Minister of Tourism of South Africa, Mr. Derek Hanekom who delivered a keynote address at the Opening Ceremony while the Closing Ceremony featured the Deputy Director General of Institutional Governance, who was representing the Deputy Minister of Arts and Culture, Ms. Rejoice Thizwilondi Mabudafhasi. Representatives from the Kenyan High Commission, Robben Island Museum, the African World Heritage Fund and the UNESCO World Heritage Centre were also in attendance.
