= Federation of Asian Chemical Societies =

The Federation of Asian Chemical Societies (FACS) is a professional association representing chemical societies of countries and territories in the Asia-Pacific region whose membership consists of individual qualified chemists. The group was founded in 1979.

FACS works to promote the advancement and practice of chemistry and the interests of professional chemists in the Asia Pacific. It also aims to server as a link between chemists in the region, and promote interactions with international chemists outside the Asia-Pacific region. Apart from fostering small meeting and workshops in the region, FACS also holds an international chemical congress, the Asian Chemical Congress (AsiaChem), at various cities in the region every two years on odd years.

== Structure ==
The General Assembly is a biannual meeting of representatives of all member societies of FACS. It is held during an Asiachem meeting and is responsible for endorsing the officers of FACS, the site for subsequent Asiachem meetings, and the recommendations of the Executive Committee regarding operation of FACS.

The Executive Committee consists of the President, President-elect, past President, Honorary General Secretary, Honorary General Secretary-elect, Treasurer, Science Directors, Communications Director and regional representatives of chemical societies. The Executive Committee [EXCO] reports to the General Assembly and is responsible for managing the affairs of FACS, and propose its strategic direction.
