= International Day of University Sport =

UNESCO holiday

- Observed by: UNESCO, FISU
- Type: International
- Begins: 2016
- Date: 20 September
- Frequency: Annual

The International Day of University Sport is a UN Educational, Scientific and Cultural Organization (UNESCO) holiday celebrated every year on 20 September.

Proposed by the International University Sports Federation (FISU) to UNESCO, it was officially proclaimed by the General Conference of UNESCO in 2015. It was first held in September 2016.

The date was chosen because it coincides not only with the start of the university academic calendar, but also with the launch of the first World Student Championships in 1924.

The day aims to highlight the importance of sport in universities, as well as the social role of universities in consolidating sports education at the service of society. The International Day of University Sport puts sport at the heart of the dialogue between teachers and students, promoting the values of sport.
