= Commonwealth Engineers Council =

The Commonwealth Engineers' Council (CEC) is a network of professional engineering institutions of the Commonwealth, established to foster cooperation and exchange of information, support the development of indigenous engineering institutions, and foster the education, training and professional development of engineers. The CEC is an affiliated organisation of The Commonwealth.

== History ==
In the autumn of 1945 the Secretary of The Institution of Civil Engineers (UK) suggested to his President and to The Institution of Mechanical Engineers and to the Institution of Electrical Engineers (now the Institution of Engineering and Technology) that a conference of representatives of Commonwealth Engineering Institutions should be held in London in 1946 to increase collaboration and co-operation between them. In consequence a meeting was held in London in September 1946 and was attended by representatives of institutions in Australia, Canada, India, New Zealand, South Africa and the UK.

Many common problems and matters of common interest were discussed. Moreover it was agreed to establish CEC (it was then called the Commonwealth Engineering Conference) and to meet on a regular basis. Subsequent meetings have been held in

- Johannesburg, South Africa 1950
- London, UK 1954
- Sydney, Melbourne and Canberra, Australia (including New Zealand) 1958
- Montreal, Canada 1962
- London, UK 1966
- Delhi, India 1969
- London, UK 1973
- Accra, Ghana 1975
- London, UK 1977
- Hong Kong 1979
- Trinidad 1981
- Harare, Zimbabwe 1983
- Colombo, Sri Lanka 1985
- Canada 1987

The pattern of meetings changed from a four year interval to a two year interval when the Commonwealth Foundation which had been founded in 1966 recognized CEC as a Commonwealth Professional Association to which it could grant funds so that representatives could attend meetings.

== CEC today ==
The Institution of Civil Engineers (ICE) serves as the Secretariat for the Commonwealth Engineers’ Council. ICE’s ties to CEC have been longstanding; the immediate Past President of CEC is ICE Past-president Professor Paul Jowitt. The current President of CEC is Dawn Bonfield.

CEC is an International member of the World Federation of Engineering Organisations (WFEO).

The Council’s main aims and objectives are the following:

- Foster co-operation and exchange of information among members;
- Support the development of indigenous engineering institutions in all member countries, associated states and colonies of the Commonwealth;
- Foster the education, training and professional development of engineers;
- Encourage and facilitate the transfer of technology between countries;
- Promote meetings on engineering and related subjects;
- Undertake specific projects and support local programmes;
- Support the contribution of engineering to sustainable development and fulfilment of the UN SDGs;
- Present the views of the engineering profession to the central Commonwealth bodies such as the Commonwealth Secretariat and through them to Commonwealth Heads of Government.

The CEC reaffiliated to The Commonwealth organisation in 2020 and formed an Executive Board.
