= Clean Energy Collective =

American clean energy company

Clean Energy Collective, LLC
- Industry: Solar Energy
- Founded: 2010
- Headquarters: 361 Centennial Parkway Louisville, Colorado, 80027 U.S.
- Key people: Paul Spencer; Tom Sweeney
- Website: www.CleanEnergyCo.com

The Clean Energy Collective (CEC) was an American clean energy company based in Louisville, Colorado, active from 2010 until its filing for bankruptcy in 2020.

== History ==
The Clean Energy Collective built, operated, and maintained community-based clean energy facilities.

The CEC provided its cooperatives with Community Solar Platform (CSP) software, which calculated production and monthly credits for participants. This product included a smartphone app.

== Community Solar Plan ==
The CSP was a service that allowed users to purchase and use solar panels without physically attaching them to their property. Solar panel owners were paid in electricity credits for the value of the electricity generated.

== Funding ==
In 2012, Sooper Credit Union of Arvada, Colorado, agreed to offer long-term loans to consumers and businesses that buy into CEC community-owned solar gardens.

Con Edison Clean Energy Businesses (Con Edison CEB), formed in 2016 and a wholly owned subsidiary of Consolidated Edison, Inc. (ConEd), "purchased a portfolio of Community Solar projects in development from Clean Energy Collective, LLC" in 2020.

== Partnership ==
The Clean Energy Collective partnered with local utilities, including Holy Cross Energy, Poudre Valley Rural Electric Association (PVREA), and the Wright-Hennepin Cooperative Electric Association.

In 2014, solar manufacturer First Solar took a minority equity position in Clean Energy Collective. It announced a "strategic partnership to develop and market" community solar gardens for utilities.

== Bankruptcy ==
In 2020, Clean Energy Collective filed for bankruptcy.

== See also ==
- Community solar farm
- American Solar Energy Society
- List of photovoltaics companies
- National Renewable Energy Laboratory
- Renewable energy in the United States
- Solar Energy Industries Association
- Venture capital
