= UNESCO =

Specialized agency of the United Nations

United Nations Educational, Scientific and Cultural Organization

- Flag of UNESCO
- Abbreviation: UNESCO
- Formation: 16 November 1945; 81 years ago
- Type: United Nations specialized agency
- Legal status: Active
- Headquarters: Paris, France
- Director-General: Khaled El-Enany
- Deputy Director-General: Åsa Regnér
- Parent organization: United Nations Economic and Social Council
- Staff: 2,384 (2024)
- Website: unesco.org

The United Nations Educational, Scientific and Cultural Organization (UNESCO /juːˈnɛskoʊ/) (Note: French: Organisation des Nations unies pour l'éducation, la science et la culture) is a specialized agency of the United Nations (UN) with the aim of promoting world peace and security through international cooperation in education, arts, sciences and culture. It has 194 member states and 11 associate members, as well as partners in the non-governmental, intergovernmental and private sector. Headquartered in Paris, France, UNESCO has 53 regional field offices and 199 national commissions.

UNESCO was founded in 1945 as the successor to the League of Nations' International Committee on Intellectual Cooperation. UNESCO's founding mission, which was shaped by the events of World War II, is to advance peace, sustainable development and human rights by facilitating collaboration and dialogue among nations. It pursues this objective through five major programme areas: education, natural sciences, social/human sciences, culture, and communication/information. UNESCO sponsors projects that improve literacy, provide technical training and education, advance science, protect independent media and press freedom, preserve regional and cultural history, and promote cultural diversity. The organization prominently helps establish and secure World Heritage Sites of cultural and natural importance.

UNESCO is governed by the General Conference composed of member states and associate members, which meets biannually to set the agency's programmes and budget. It also elects members of the executive board, which manages UNESCO's work, and appoints every four years a Director-General, who is the UNESCO chief administrator.

== History ==
=== Origins ===
UNESCO and its mandate for international cooperation can be traced to a League of Nations resolution on 21 September 1921, to elect a commission to study the feasibility of having nations freely share cultural, educational and scientific achievements. This new body, the International Committee on Intellectual Cooperation (ICIC), was created in 1922 and counted such figures as Henri Bergson, Albert Einstein, Marie Curie, Robert A. Millikan, and Gonzague de Reynold among its members (being thus a small commission of the League of Nations essentially centred on Western Europe). The International Institute for Intellectual Cooperation (IIIC) was then created in Paris in September 1924, to act as the executing agency for the ICIC. However, the onset of World War II largely interrupted the work of these predecessor organizations. As for private initiatives, the International Bureau of Education (IBE) began to work as a non-governmental organization in the service of international educational development since December 1925 and joined UNESCO in 1969, after having established a joint commission in 1952.

=== Creation ===
After the signing of the Atlantic Charter and the Declaration of the United Nations, the Conference of Allied Ministers of Education (CAME) began meetings in London which continued from 16 November 1942 to 5 December 1945. On 30 October 1943, the necessity for an international organization was expressed in the Moscow Declaration, agreed upon by China, the United Kingdom, the United States and the USSR. This was followed by the Dumbarton Oaks Conference proposals of 9 October 1944. Upon the proposal of CAME and in accordance with the recommendations of the United Nations Conference on International Organization (UNCIO), held in San Francisco from April to June 1945, a United Nations Conference for the establishment of an educational and cultural organization (ECO/CONF) was convened in London from 1 to 16 November 1945 with forty-four governments represented. The idea of UNESCO was largely developed by Rab Butler, the Minister of Education for the United Kingdom, who had a great deal of influence in its development. At the ECO/CONF, the Constitution of UNESCO was introduced through Article 57, and signed by 41 countries, and a Preparatory Commission was established. The Preparatory Commission operated between 16 November 1945, and 4 November 1946 — the date when UNESCO's Constitution came into force with the deposit of the twentieth ratification by a member state.

The first General Conference took place from 19 November to 10 December 1946, and elected Julian Huxley to Director-General. United States Army colonel, university president and civil rights advocate Blake R. Van Leer joined as a member as well. The Constitution was amended in November 1954 when the General Conference resolved that members of the executive board would be representatives of the governments of the States of which they are nationals and would not, as before, act in their personal capacity. This change in governance distinguished UNESCO from its predecessor, the ICIC, in how member states would work together in the organization's fields of competence. As member states worked together over time to realize UNESCO's mandate, political and historical factors have shaped the organization's operations in particular during the Cold War, the decolonization process, and the dissolution of the Soviet Union.

=== Development ===
Among the major achievements of the organization is its work against racism, for example through influential statements on race starting with a declaration of anthropologists (among them was Claude Lévi-Strauss) and other scientists in 1950 and concluding with the 1978 Declaration on Race and Racial Prejudice.

In 1955, the Republic of South Africa withdrew from UNESCO saying that some of the organization's publications amounted to "interference" in the country's "racial problems". It rejoined the organization in 1994 under the leadership of Nelson Mandela.

One of the early work of UNESCO in the education field was a pilot project on fundamental education in the Marbial Valley, Haiti, which was launched in 1947. Following this project one of expert missions to other countries, included a 1949 mission to Afghanistan. UNESCO recommended in 1948 that Member countries should make free primary education compulsory and universal. The World Conference on Education for All, in Jomtien, Thailand, started a global movement in 1990 to provide basic education for all children, youths and adults. In 2000, World Education Forum in Dakar, Senegal, led member governments to commit for achieving basic education for all in 2015.

The World Declaration on Higher Education was adopted by UNESCO's World Conference on Higher Education on 9 October 1998, with the aim of setting global standards on the ideals and accessibility of higher education.

UNESCO's early activities in culture included the International Campaign to Save the Monuments of Nubia, launched in 1960. The purpose of the campaign was to move the Great Temple of Abu Simbel to keep it from being swamped by the Nile after the construction of the Aswan Dam. During the 20-year campaign, 22 monuments and architectural complexes were relocated. This was the first and largest in a series of campaigns including Mohenjo-daro (Pakistan), Fes (Morocco), Kathmandu (Nepal), Borobudur (Indonesia) and the Acropolis of Athens (Greece). The organization's work on heritage led to the adoption, in 1972, of the Convention concerning the Protection of the World Cultural and Natural Heritage. In 1976, the World Heritage Committee was established and the first sites were included on the World Heritage List in 1978. Since then important legal instruments on cultural heritage and diversity have been adopted by UNESCO member states in 2003 (Convention for the Safeguarding of the Intangible Cultural Heritage) and 2005 (Convention on the Protection and Promotion of the Diversity of Cultural Expressions).

An intergovernmental meeting of UNESCO in Paris in December 1951 led to the creation of the European Council for Nuclear Research, which was responsible for establishing the European Organization for Nuclear Research (CERN) later on, in 1954.

Arid Zone programming, 1948–1966, is another example of an early major UNESCO project in the field of natural sciences.

In 1968, UNESCO organized the first intergovernmental conference aimed at reconciling the environment and development, a problem that continues to be addressed in the field of sustainable development. The main outcome of the 1968 conference was the creation of UNESCO's Man and the Biosphere Programme.

UNESCO has been credited with the diffusion of national science bureaucracies.

In the field of communication, the "free flow of ideas by word and image" has been in UNESCO's constitution since it was established, following the experience of the Second World War when control of information was a factor in indoctrinating populations for aggression. In the years immediately following World War II, efforts were concentrated on reconstruction and on the identification of needs for means of mass communication around the world. UNESCO started organizing training and education for journalists in the 1950s. In response to calls for a "New World Information and Communication Order" in the late 1970s, UNESCO established the International Commission for the Study of Communication Problems, which produced the 1980 MacBride report (named after the chair of the commission, the Nobel Peace Prize laureate Seán MacBride). The same year, UNESCO created the International Programme for the Development of Communication (IPDC), a multilateral forum designed to promote media development in developing countries. In 1993, UNESCO's General Conference endorsed the Windhoek Declaration on media independence and pluralism, which led the UN General Assembly to declare the date of its adoption, 3 May, as World Press Freedom Day. Since 1997, UNESCO has awarded the UNESCO / Guillermo Cano World Press Freedom Prize every 3 May.

=== Changes in States' memberships ===
==== Israel, Palestine, and the United States ====
In 2011, UNESCO admitted Palestine as a member.

Laws passed in the United States after Palestine applied for UNESCO and WHO membership in April 1989 mean that the United States cannot contribute financially to any UN organization that accepts Palestine as a full member. As a result, the United States withdrew its funding, which had accounted for about 22% of UNESCO's budget. Israel also reacted to Palestine's admittance to UNESCO by freezing Israeli payments to UNESCO and imposing sanctions on the Palestinian Authority, stating that Palestine's admittance would be detrimental "to potential peace talks".

In 2013, two years after stopping payment of its dues to UNESCO, the United States and Israel lost UNESCO voting rights, but without losing the right to be elected; thus, the United States was elected as a member of the executive board for the period from 2016 to 2019. In 2019, Israel left UNESCO after 69 years of membership, with Israel's ambassador to the UN Danny Danon writing: "UNESCO is the body that continually rewrites history, including by erasing the Jewish connection to Jerusalem... it is corrupted and manipulated by Israel's enemies... we are not going to be a member of an organization that deliberately acts against us."

Also in 2023, the United States stated its intent to rejoin UNESCO, five years after leaving, and to pay its US$600 million of back dues. The United States was readmitted by the UNESCO General Conference that July. Three years later, in 2025, however, the United States stated its intent to withdraw again, to be effective as of December 2026.

==== Russia ====
In 2023, Russia was not renewed as member of the executive committee for the first time, after failing to get sufficient votes.

=== Cultural policies and sustainable development ===
In the context of the COVID-19 pandemic and United Nations-wide efforts to achieve the 2030 Sustainable Development Agenda, the UNESCO reactivated in 2022 the cycle of MONDIACULT Conferences (World Conference on Cultural Policies and Sustainable Development) whose first edition had been held in Mexico City in 1982. The 2022 MONDIACULT conference was held again in Mexico, and a 2025 edition is planned in Barcelona, Spain.

== Activities ==
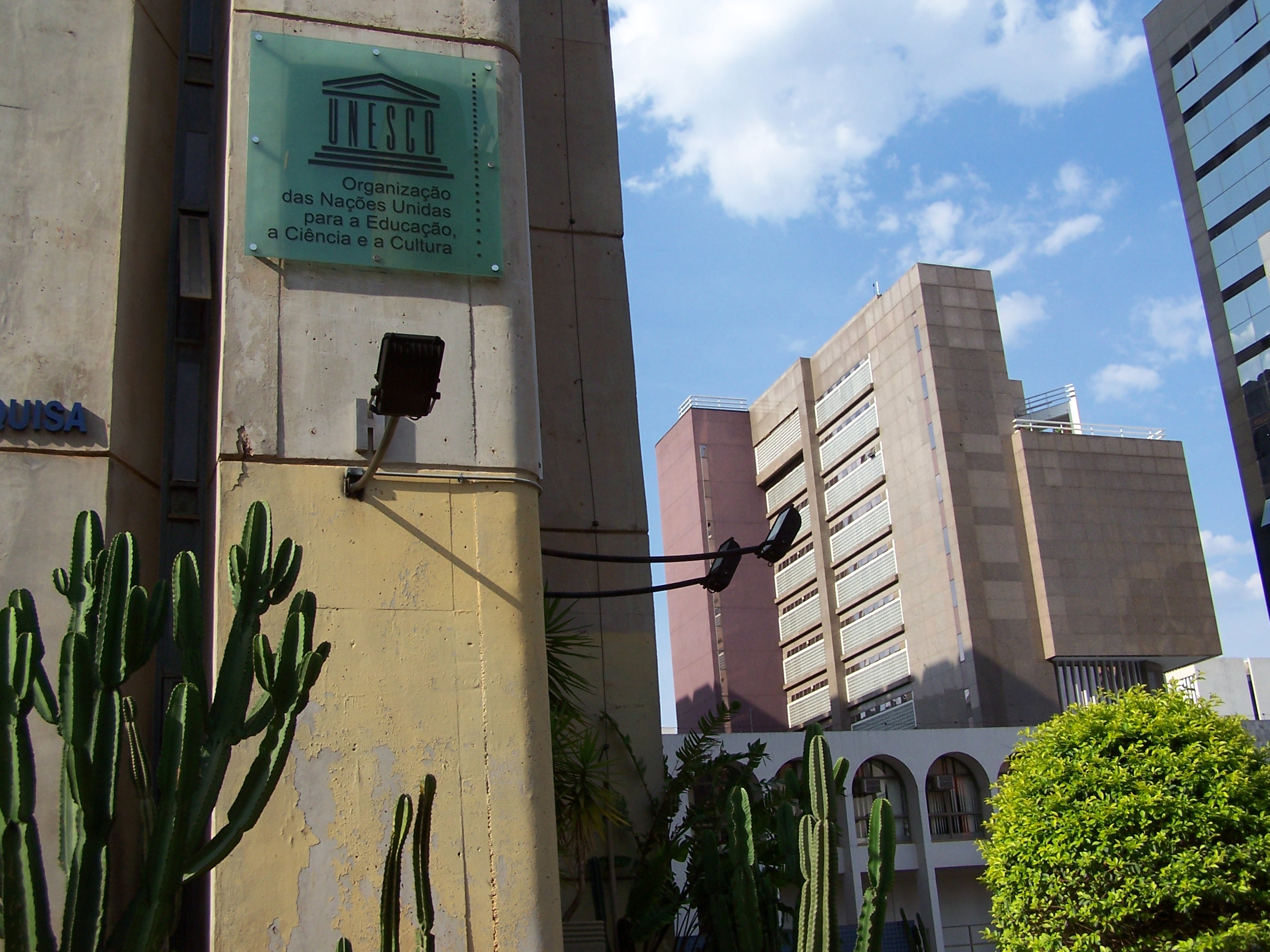
UNESCO offices in Brasília.

UNESCO implements its activities through five programme areas: education, natural sciences, social and human sciences, culture, and communication and information.

- UNESCO supports research in comparative education, provides expertise and fosters partnerships to strengthen national educational leadership and the capacity of countries to offer quality education for all.
  - UNESCO Chairs, an international network of 644 UNESCO chairs, involving more than 770 institutions in 126 countries
  - Environmental Conservation Organization
  - Convention against Discrimination in Education adopted in 1960
  - Organization of the International Conference on Adult Education (CONFINTEA) in an interval of 12 years
  - Publication of the Education for All Global Monitoring Report
  - Publication of the Four Pillars of Learning seminal document
  - UNESCO ASPNet, an international network of more than 12,000 schools in 182 countries
  - UNESCO does not accredit institutions of higher learning.
- UNESCO also issues public statements to educate the public:
  - Seville Statement on Violence: A statement adopted by UNESCO in 1989 to refute the notion that humans are biologically predisposed to organized violence.
- Designating projects and places of cultural and scientific significance, such as:
  - Global Geoparks Network
  - Biosphere reserves, through the Programme on Man and the Biosphere (MAB), since 1971
  - City of Literature; in 2007, the first city to be given this title was Edinburgh, the site of Scotland's first circulating library. In 2008, Iowa City, Iowa, became the City of Literature.
  - Creative Cities Network
  - Endangered languages and linguistic diversity projects (UNESCO Atlas of the World's Languages in Danger)
  - Masterpieces of the Oral and Intangible Heritage of Humanity
  - Memory of the World International Register, since 1997, plus a number of national and regional registers
  - Water resources management, through the International Hydrological Programme (IHP), since 1965
  - World Heritage Sites
  - World Digital Library
- Encouraging the "free flow of ideas by images and words" by:
  - Promoting freedom of expression, including freedom of the press and freedom of information legislation, through the Division of Freedom of Expression and Media Development, including the International Programme for the Development of Communication
  - Promoting the safety of journalists and combatting impunity for those who attack them, through coordination of the UN Plan of Action on the Safety of Journalists and the Issue of Impunity
  - Promoting universal access to and preservation of information and open solutions for sustainable development through the Knowledge Societies Division, including the Memory of the World Programme and Information for All Programme
  - Promoting pluralism, gender equality and cultural diversity in the media
  - Promoting Internet Universality and its principles, that the Internet should be (I) human Rights-based, (ii) Open, (iii) Accessible to all, and (iv) nurtured by Multi-stakeholder participation (summarized as the acronym R.O.A.M.)
  - Generating knowledge through publications such as World Trends in Freedom of Expression and Media Development, the UNESCO Series on Internet Freedom, and the Media Development Indicators, as well as other indicator-based studies.
- Promoting events, such as:
  - International Decade for the Promotion of a Culture of Peace and Non-Violence for the Children of the World: 2001–2010, proclaimed by the UN in 1998
  - World Press Freedom Day, 3 May each year, to promote freedom of expression and freedom of the press as a basic human right and as crucial components of any healthy, democratic and free society.
  - Criança Esperança in Brazil, in partnership with Rede Globo, to raise funds for community-based projects that foster social integration and violence prevention.
  - International Literacy Day, 8 September each year
  - International Year for the Culture of Peace, 2000
  - Health Education for Behavior Change programme in partnership with the Ministry of Education of Kenya which was financially supported by the Government of Azerbaijan to promote health education among 10-19-year-old young people who live in informal camp in Kibera, Nairobi. The project was carried out between September 2014 – December 2016.
  - World Day for Cultural Diversity for Dialogue and Development 21 May each year
- Founding and funding projects, such as:
  - Migration Museums Initiative: Promoting the establishment of museums for cultural dialogue with migrant populations.
  - UNESCO-CEPES, the European Centre for Higher Education: established in 1972 in Bucharest, Romania, as a decentralized office to promote international co-operation in higher education in Europe as well as Canada, USA and Israel. Higher Education in Europe is its official journal.
  - Free Software Directory: since 1998 UNESCO and the Free Software Foundation have jointly funded this project cataloguing free software.
  - FRESH, Focusing Resources on Effective School Health
  - OANA, Organization of Asia-Pacific News Agencies
  - International Council of Science
  - UNESCO Goodwill Ambassadors
  - ASOMPS, Asian Symposium on Medicinal Plants and Spices, a series of scientific conferences held in Asia
  - Botany 2000, a programme supporting taxonomy, and biological and cultural diversity of medicinal and ornamental plants, and their protection against environmental pollution
  - The UNESCO Collection of Representative Works, translating works of world literature both to and from multiple languages, from 1948 to 2005
  - GoUNESCO, an umbrella of initiatives to make heritage fun supported by UNESCO, New Delhi Office
  - UNESCO-CHIC BIRUP, UNESCO-CHIC Group (China) Biosphere Rural and Urbanization Programme

The UNESCO transparency portal has been designed to enable public access to information regarding the Organization's activities, such as its aggregate budget for a biennium, as well as links to relevant programmatic and financial documents. These two distinct sets of information are published on the IATI registry, respectively based on the IATI Activity Standard and the IATI Organization Standard.

=== New proposed lists ===
Two new UNESCO lists have been proposed.

The first proposed list would focus on movable cultural heritage such as artifacts, paintings, and biofacts. The list could include cultural objects, such as the Jōmon Venus of Japan, the Mona Lisa of France, the Gebel el-Arak Knife of Egypt, The Ninth Wave of Russia, the Seated Woman of Çatalhöyük of Turkey, the David (Michelangelo) of Italy, the Mathura Herakles of India, the Manunggul Jar of the Philippines, the Crown of Baekje of South Korea, The Hay Wain of the United Kingdom, and the Benin Bronzes of Nigeria.

The second proposed list would focus on the world's living species.

== Media ==
UNESCO and its specialized institutions issue a number of magazines.

Created in 1945, The UNESCO Courier magazine states its mission to "promote UNESCO's ideals, maintain a platform for the dialogue between cultures and provide a forum for international debate". Since March 2006 it has been available free online, with limited printed issues. Its articles express the opinions of the authors which are not necessarily the opinions of UNESCO. There was a hiatus in publishing between 2012 and 2017.

In 1950, UNESCO initiated the quarterly review Impact of Science on Society (also known as Impact) to discuss the influence of science on society. The journal ceased publication in 1992.

== Official UNESCO NGOs ==
UNESCO has official relations with 322 international non-governmental organizations (NGOs). Most of these are what UNESCO calls "operational"; a select few are "formal". The highest form of affiliation to UNESCO is "formal associate", and the 22 NGOs with formal associate (ASC) relations occupying offices at UNESCO are:

Abbr	Organization
IB	International Baccalaureate
CCIVS	Co-ordinating Committee for International Voluntary Service
CIPSH	International Council for Philosophy and Humanistic Studies (Conseil International de Philosophie et des Sciences Humaines; publishes Diogenes)
CIOFF	International Council of Organizations of Folklore Festivals and Folk Arts (Conseil International des Organisations de Festivals de Folklore et d'Arts Traditionnels)
EI	Education International
IAU	International Association of Universities
IFTC	International Council for Film, Television and Audiovisual Communication
ICOM	International Council of Museums
ICSSPE	International Council of Sport Science and Physical Education
ICA	International Council on Archives
ICOMOS	International Council on Monuments and Sites
IFJ	International Federation of Journalists
IFLA	International Federation of Library Associations and Institutions
IFPA	International Federation of Poetry Associations
IMC	International Music Council
IPA	International Police Association
INSULA	International Scientific Council for Island Development
ISC	International Science Council (formerly ICSU and ISSC)
ITI	International Theatre Institute
IUCN	International Union for Conservation of Nature and Natural Resources
IUTAO	International Union of Technical Associations and Organizations
UIA	Union of International Associations
WAN	World Association of Newspapers
WFEO	World Federation of Engineering Organizations
WFUCA	World Federation of UNESCO Clubs, Centres and Associations

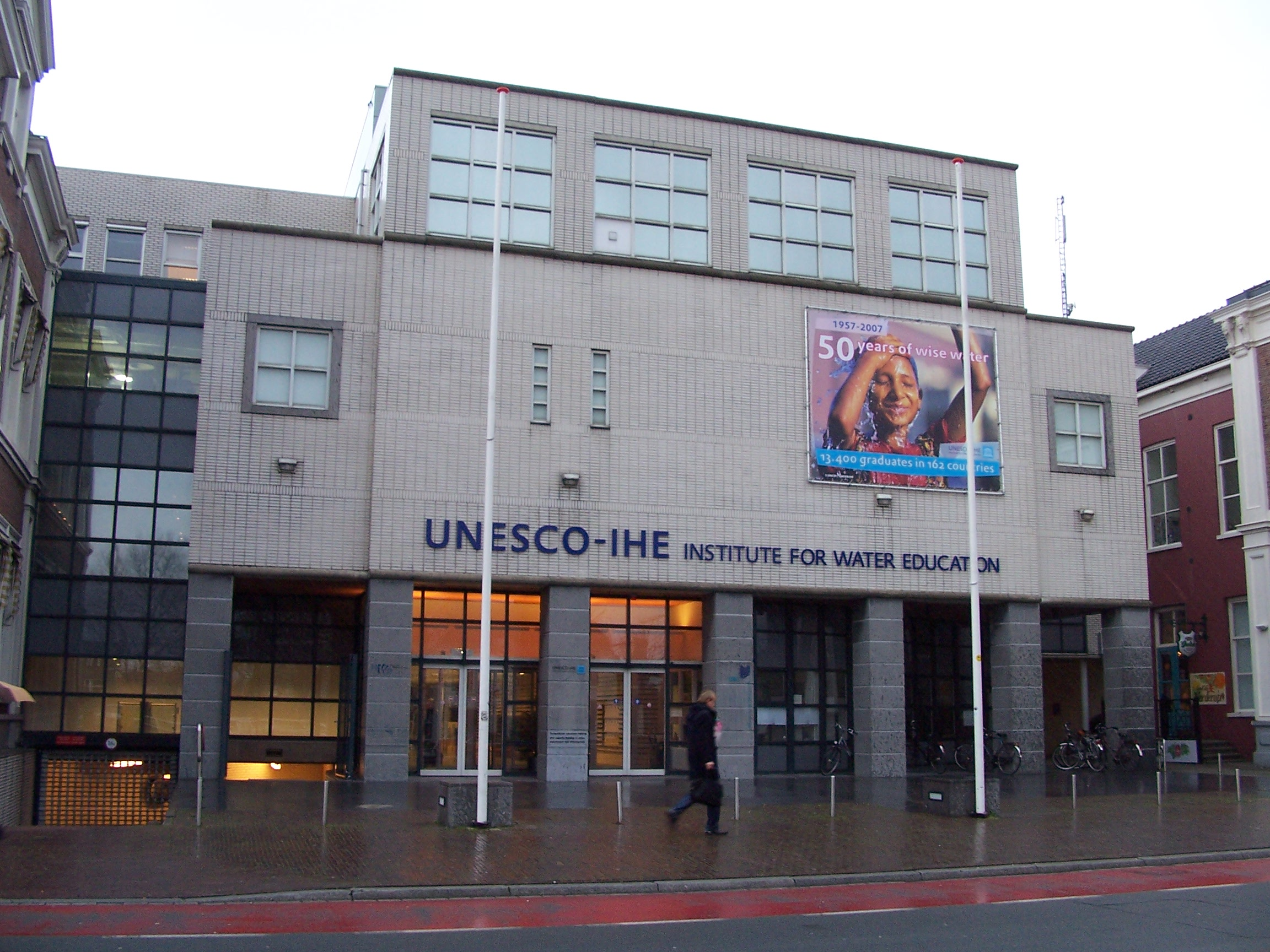
UNESCO Institute for Water Education in Delft

== Institutes and centres ==
The institutes are specialized departments of the organization that support UNESCO's programme, providing specialized support for cluster and national offices.

Abbr	Name	Location
IBE	International Bureau of Education	Geneva
UIL	UNESCO Institute for Lifelong Learning	Hamburg
IIEP	UNESCO International Institute for Educational Planning	Paris (headquarters) and Buenos Aires and Dakar (regional offices)
IITE	UNESCO Institute for Information Technologies in Education	Moscow
IICBA	UNESCO International Institute for Capacity Building in Africa	Addis Ababa
IESALC	UNESCO International Institute for Higher Education in Latin America and the Caribbean	Caracas
MGIEP	Mahatma Gandhi Institute of Education for Peace and Sustainable Development	New Delhi
UNESCO-UNEVOC	UNESCO-UNEVOC International Centre for Technical and Vocational Education and Training	Bonn
ICWRGC	International Centre for Water Resources and Global Change	Koblenz
IHE	IHE-Delft Institute for Water Education	Delft
ICTP	International Centre for Theoretical Physics	Trieste
UIS	UNESCO Institute for Statistics	Montreal

== Prizes ==
UNESCO awards 26 prizes in education, natural sciences, social and human sciences, culture, communication and information as well as peace:

=== Education ===
- UNESCO/King Sejong Literacy Prize
- UNESCO/Confucius Prize for Literacy
- UNESCO-Japan Prize on Education for Sustainable Development
- UNESCO Prize for Girls' and Women's Education
- UNESCO/Hamdan Bin Rashid Al-Maktoum Prize for Outstanding Practice and Performance in Enhancing the Effectiveness of Teachers
- UNESCO King Hamad Bin Isa Al-Khalifa Prize for the Use of Information and Communication Technologies in Education

=== Natural Sciences ===
- L'Oréal-UNESCO Awards for Women in Science
- UNESCO/Kalinga Prize for the Popularization of Science
- UNESCO-Equatorial Guinea International Prize for Research in the Life Sciences
- Carlos J. Finlay Prize for Microbiology
- UNESCO/Sultan Qaboos Prize for Environmental Preservation
- UNESCO-Russia Mendeleev International Prize in the Basic Sciences
- UNESCO-Al Fozan International Prize for the Promotion of Young Scientists in STEM
- Michel Batisse Award for Biosphere Reserve Management

=== Social and Human Sciences ===
- UNESCO Avicenna Prize for Ethics in Science
- UNESCO/Juan Bosch Prize for the Promotion of Social Science Research in Latin America and the Caribbean
- UNESCO-Madanjeet Singh Prize for the Promotion of Tolerance and Non-Violence
- UNESCO-Sharjah Prize for Arab Culture
- UNESCO/International José Martí Prize
- UNESCO-UNAM / Jaime Torres Bodet Prize in social sciences, humanities and arts

=== Culture ===
- Melina Mercouri International Prize for the Safeguarding and Management of Cultural Landscapes (UNESCO-Greece)

=== Communication and Information ===
- UNESCO/Guillermo Cano World Press Freedom Prize
- UNESCO/Emir Jaber al-Ahmad al-Jaber al-Sabah Prize to promote Quality Education for Persons with Intellectual Disabilities
- UNESCO/Jikji Memory of the World Prize

=== Peace ===
- Félix Houphouët-Boigny Peace Prize

=== Inactive prizes ===
- International Simón Bolívar Prize (inactive since 2004)
- UNESCO Prize for Human Rights Education
- UNESCO/Obiang Nguema Mbasogo International Prize for Research in the Life Sciences (inactive since 2010)
- UNESCO Prize for the Promotion of the Arts

== International Days observed at UNESCO ==
International Days observed at UNESCO are provided in the table below:

Date	Name
14 January	World Logic Day
24 January	World Day for African and Afrodescendant Culture
24 January	International Day of Education
25 January	International Day of Women in Multilateralism
27 January	International Day of Commemoration in Memory of the Victims of the Holocaust
11 February	International Day of Women and Girls in Science
13 February	World Radio Day
21 February	International Mother Language Day
4 March	UNESCO World Engineering Day for Sustainable Development
8 March	International Women's Day
14 March	International Day of Mathematics
20 March	International Francophonie Day
21 March	International Day of Nowruz
21 March	World Poetry Day
21 March	International Day for the Elimination of Racial Discrimination
22 March	World Water Day
5 April	International Day of Conscience
6 April	International Day of Sport for Development and Peace
15 April	World Art Day
23 April	World Book and Copyright Day
30 April	International Jazz Day
3 May	World Press Freedom Day
5 May	African World Heritage Day
5 May	World Portuguese Language Day
16 May	International Day of Light
21 May	World Day for Cultural Diversity for Dialogue and Development
22 May	International Day for Biological Diversity
5 June	World Environment Day
8 June	World Oceans Day
17 June	World Day to Combat Desertification and Drought
7 July	Kiswahili Language Day
15 July	World Youth Skills Day
18 July	Nelson Mandela International Day
26 July	International Day for the Conservation of the Mangrove Ecosystem
9 August	International Day of the World's Indigenous People
12 August	International Youth Day
23 August	International Day for the Remembrance of the Slave Trade and its Abolition
8 September	International Literacy Day
9 September	International Day to Protect Education from Attack
13 September	International Cave and Karst Day
15 September	International Day of Democracy
20 September	International Day for University Sport
21 September	International Day of Peace
28 September	International Day for the Universal Access to Information
5 October	World Teachers' Day
6 October	International Geodiversity Day
11 October	International Day of the Girl Child
13 October	International Day for Disaster Reduction
17 October	International Day for the Eradication of Poverty
24 October	United Nations Day
27 October	World Day for Audiovisual Heritage
2 November	International Day to End Impunity for Crimes Against Journalists
3 November	International Day for Biosphere Reserves
First Thursday of November	International day against violence and bullying at school including cyberbullying
5 November	World Day of Romani Language
5 November	World Tsunami Awareness Day
10 November	World Science Day for Peace and Development
14 November	International Day against Illicit Trafficking in Cultural Property
Third Thursday of November	World Philosophy Day
16 November	International Day for Tolerance
18 November	International International Day of Islamic Art
25 November	International Day for the Elimination of Violence against Women
26 November	World Olive Tree Day
29 November	International Day of Solidarity with the Palestinian People
1 December	World AIDS Day
2 December	World Futures Day
3 December	International Day of Persons with Disabilities
10 December	Human Rights Day
18 December	International Migrants Day
18 December	World Arabic Language Day

== Member states ==
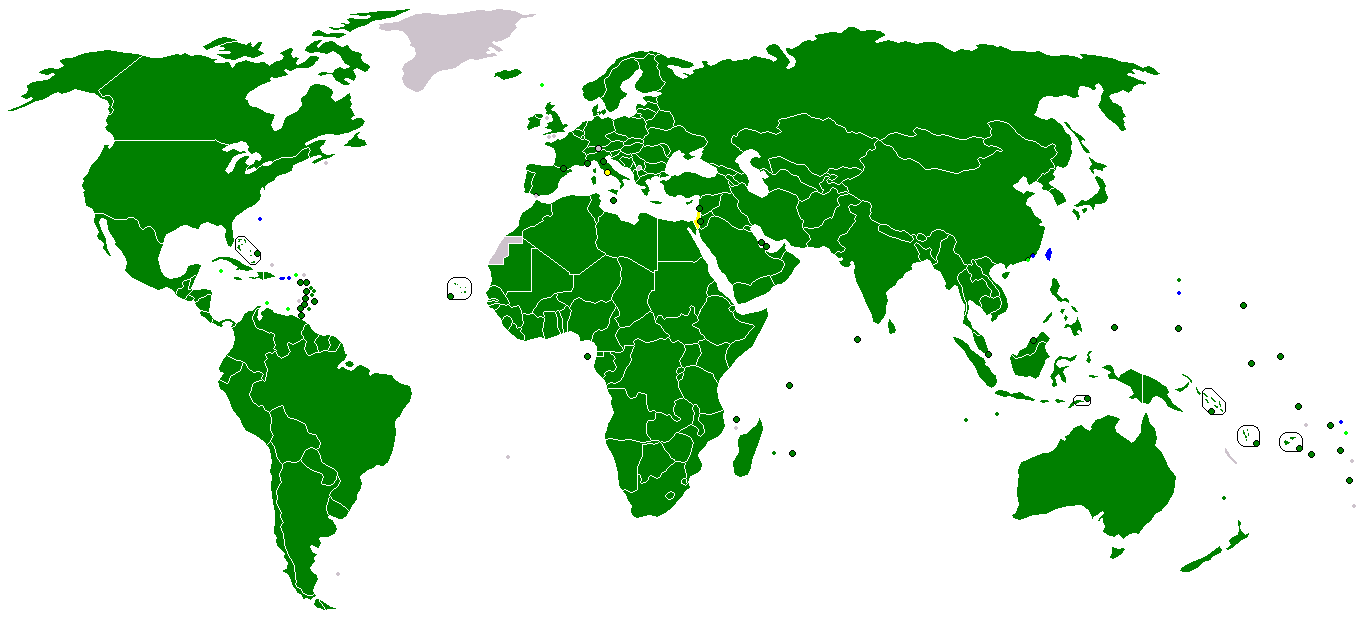
UNESCO member states UNESCO member state dependent territory with separate NOC UNESCO associates UNESCO observers

As of July 2023, UNESCO has 194 member states and 12 associate members. Some members are not independent states and some members have additional National Organizing Committees from some of their dependent territories. UNESCO state parties are the United Nations member states (except Israel and Liechtenstein), as well as Cook Islands, Niue and Palestine. Israel left UNESCO on 31 December 2018.

On 4 May 2025, Nicaragua announced its decision to withdraw from UNESCO, effective 31 December 2026.

The United States left UNESCO in 1984, rejoined in 2003, left again in 2018, and rejoined in 2023. On 22 July 2025, the United States informed the Director-General of its decision to withdraw again, effective 31 December 2026.

== Governing bodies ==
=== Director-General ===
As of June 2023, there have been 12 Directors-General of UNESCO since its inception – nine men and two women. The 12 Directors-General of UNESCO have come from seven regions within the organization: West Europe (5), Central America (1), North America (2), West Africa (1), East Asia (1), East Europe (1), Middle East (1).

To date, there has been no elected Director-General from the remaining ten regions within UNESCO: Southeast Asia, South Asia, Central and North Asia, North Africa, East Africa, Central Africa, South Africa, Australia-Oceania, and South America.

The list of the Directors-General of UNESCO since its establishment in 1946 is as follows:

Directors-General of UNESCO
Order	Image	Name	Country	Term
1st		Julian Huxley	United Kingdom	1946–1948
2nd		Jaime Torres Bodet	Mexico	1948–1952
–		John Wilkinson Taylor	United States	acting 1952–1953
3rd		Luther Evans	United States	1953–1958
4th		Vittorino Veronese	Italy	1958–1961
5th		René Maheu	France	acting 1961; 1961–1974
6th		Amadou-Mahtar M'Bow	Senegal	1974–1987
7th		Federico Mayor Zaragoza	Spain	1987–1999
8th		Koïchiro Matsuura	Japan	1999–2009
9th		Irina Bokova	Bulgaria	2009–2017
10th		Audrey Azoulay	France	2017–2025
11th		Khaled al-Anani	Egypt	2025–Incumbent

=== General Conference ===
This is the list of the sessions of the UNESCO General Conference held since 1946:

Session	Location	Year	Chaired by	from
1st	Paris	1946	Léon Blum	France
2nd	Mexico City	1947	Manuel Gual Vidal	Mexico
3rd	Beirut	1948	Hamid Bey Frangie	Lebanon
1st extraordinary	Paris	1948		
4th	Paris	1949	Edward Ronald Walker	Australia
5th	Florence	1950	Stefano Jacini	Italy
6th	Paris	1951	Howland H. Sargeant	United States
7th	Paris	1952	Sarvepalli Radhakrishnan	India
2nd extraordinary	Paris	1953		
8th	Montevideo	1954	Justino Zavala Muniz	Uruguay
9th	New Delhi	1956	Abul Kalam Azad	India
10th	Paris	1958	Jean Berthoin	France
11th	Paris	1960	Akale-Work Abte-Wold	Ethiopia
12th	Paris	1962	Paulo de Berrêdo Carneiro	Brazil
13th	Paris	1964	Norair Sisakian	Soviet Union
14th	Paris	1966	Bedrettin Tuncel	Turkey
15th	Paris	1968	William Eteki Mboumoua	Cameroon
16th	Paris	1970	Atilio Dell'Oro Maini	Argentina
17th	Paris	1972	Toru Haguiwara	Japan
3rd extraordinary	Paris	1973		
18th	Paris	1974	Magda Jóború	Hungary
19th	Nairobi	1976	Taaita Toweett	Kenya
20th	Paris	1978	Napoléon LeBlanc	Canada
21st	Belgrade	1980	Ivo Margan	Yugoslavia
4th extraordinary	Paris	1982		
22nd	Paris	1983	Saïd Tell	Jordan
23rd	Sofia	1985	Nikolai Todorov	Bulgaria
24th	Paris	1987	Guillermo Putzeys Alvarez	Guatemala
25th	Paris	1989	Anwar Ibrahim	Malaysia
26th	Paris	1991	Bethwell Allan Ogot	Kenya
27th	Paris	1993	Ahmed Saleh Sayyad	Yemen
28th	Paris	1995	Torben Krogh	Denmark
29th	Paris	1997	Eduardo Portella	Brazil
30th	Paris	1999	Jaroslava Moserová	Czech Republic
31st	Paris	2001	Ahmad Jalali	Iran
32nd	Paris	2003	Michael Omolewa	Nigeria
33rd	Paris	2005	Musa Bin Jaafar Bin Hassan	Oman
34th	Paris	2007	Georgios Anastassopoulos	Greece
35th	Paris	2009	Davidson Hepburn	Bahamas
36th	Paris	2011	Katalin Bogyay	Hungary
37th	Paris	2013	Hao Ping	China
38th	Paris	2015	Stanley Mutumba Simataa	Namibia
39th	Paris	2017	Zohour Alaoui	Morocco
40th	Paris	2019	Ahmet Altay Cengizer	Turkey
41st	Paris	2021	Santiago Irazabal Mourão	Brazil
42nd	Paris	2023	Simona Miculescu	Romania
43nd	Samarkand	2025	Khondker Talkha	Bangladesh

=== Executive Board ===
Biennial elections are held, with 58 elected representatives holding office for four years.

Term	Group I (9 seats)	Group II (7 seats)	Group III (10 seats)	Group IV (12 seats)	Group V(a) (13 seats)	Group V(b) (7 seats)
2017– 2021	Finland; Portugal; Turkey	Albania; Belarus; Bulgaria	Cuba; Grenada; Jamaica; Saint Lucia; Saint Vincent and the Grenadines; Venezuela	Bangladesh; China; India; Indonesia; Japan; Philippines	Burundi; Equatorial Guinea; Ethiopia; Madagascar; Zambia; Zimbabwe	Egypt; Jordan; Morocco
2019–2023	France; Germany; Italy; Netherlands; Spain; Switzerland	Hungary; Poland; Russia; Serbia	Argentina; Brazil; Dominican Republic; Uruguay	Afghanistan; Kyrgyzstan; Philippines; Pakistan; South Korea; Thailand	Benin; Congo; Guinea; Ghana; Kenya; Namibia; Senegal; Togo	Saudi Arabia; UAE; Tunisia
2021–2025	Austria; Iceland; Turkey	Armenia; Azerbaijan; Lithuania	Chile; Grenada; Haiti; Mexico; Paraguay; Saint Lucia	China; Cook Islands; India; Japan; Philippines; Vietnam	Angola; Botswana; Congo; Djibouti; South Africa; Tanzania	Egypt; Jordan; Kuwait
2023–2027	France; Germany; Italy; Spain; United Kingdom; United States	Albania; Czech Republic; Serbia; Slovakia	Argentina; Brazil; Cuba; Dominican Republic	Australia; Bangladesh; Indonesia; Pakistan; South Korea; Sri Lanka	Burkina Faso; Gabon; Ivory Coast; Liberia; Mauritius; Mozambique; Nigeria	Iraq; Oman; Qatar; Saudi Arabia

== Offices and headquarters ==
The UNESCO headquarters is located at Place de Fontenoy in Paris, France. Several architects collaborated on the construction of the headquarters, including Bernard Zehrfuss, Marcel Breuer and Luigi Nervi.

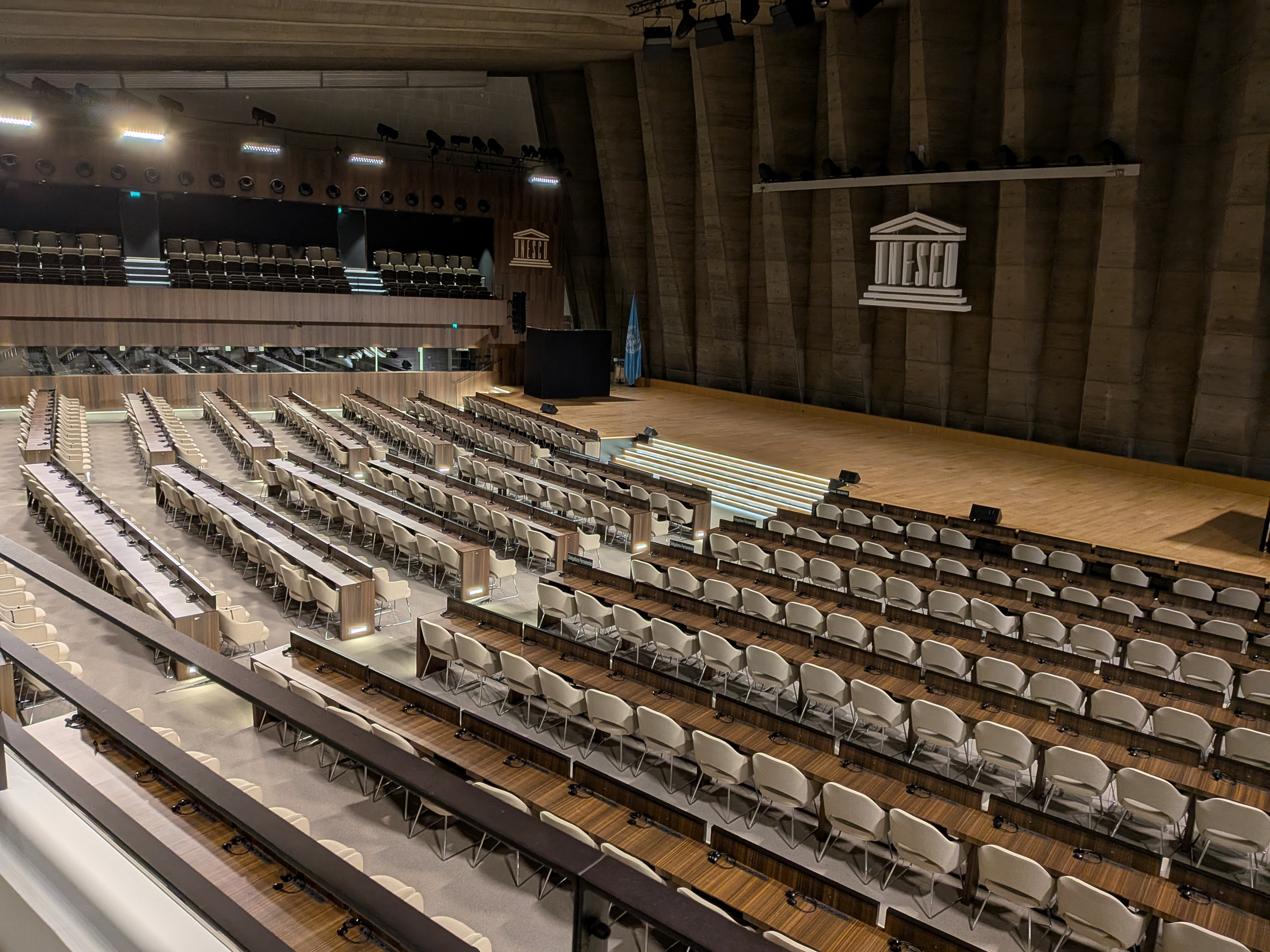
Main conference room at UNESCO headquarters (Paris).

It includes a Garden of Peace which was donated by the Government of Japan. This garden was designed by American-Japanese sculptor artist Isamu Noguchi in 1958 and installed by Japanese gardener Toemon Sano. In 1994–1995, in memory of the 50th anniversary of UNESCO, a meditation room was built by Tadao Ando.

UNESCO's field offices across the globe are categorized into four primary office types based upon their function and geographic coverage: cluster offices, national offices, regional bureaus and liaison offices.

=== Field offices by region ===
The following list of all UNESCO Field Offices is organized geographically by UNESCO Region and identifies the members states and associate members of UNESCO which are served by each office.

==== Africa ====
African field office locations
office	countries/organisations covered
Abidjan	National Office to Ivory Coast
Abuja	National Office to Nigeria
Accra	Cluster Office for Benin, Ghana, Ivory Coast, Liberia, Nigeria, Sierra Leone and Togo
Addis Ababa	Liaison Office with the African Union and with the Economic Commission for Africa
Bamako	Cluster Office for Burkina Faso, Guinea, Mali and Niger
Brazzaville	National Office to the Republic of the Congo
Bujumbura	National Office to Burundi
Dakar	Regional Bureau for Education in Africa and Cluster Office for Cape Verde, Gambia, Guinea-Bissau, and Senegal
Dar es Salaam	Cluster Office for Comoros, Madagascar, Mauritius, Seychelles and Tanzania
Harare	Cluster Office for Botswana, Eswatini, Lesotho, Malawi, Mozambique, South Africa, Zambia and Zimbabwe
Juba	National Office to South Sudan
Kinshasa	National Office to the Democratic Republic of the Congo
Libreville	Cluster Office for the Republic of the Congo, Democratic Republic of the Congo, Equatorial Guinea, Gabon and São Tomé and Príncipe
Maputo	National Office to Mozambique
Nairobi	Regional Bureau for Sciences in Africa and Cluster Office for Burundi, Djibouti, Eritrea, Kenya, Rwanda, Somalia, South Sudan and Uganda
Windhoek	National Office to Namibia
Yaoundé	Cluster Office to Cameroon, Central African Republic and Chad

==== Arab States ====
- Amman – National Office to Jordan
- Beirut – Regional Bureau for Education in the Arab States and Cluster Office to Lebanon, Syria, Jordan, Iraq and Palestine
- Cairo – Regional Bureau for Sciences in the Arab States and Cluster Office for Egypt and Sudan
- Doha – Cluster Office to Bahrain, Kuwait, Oman, Qatar, Saudi Arabia, United Arab Emirates and Yemen
- Iraq – National Office for Iraq (currently located in Amman, Jordan)
- Khartoum – National Office to Sudan
- Manama – Arab Regional Centre for World Heritage
- Rabat – Cluster Office to Algeria, Libya, Mauritania, Morocco and Tunisia
- Ramallah – National Office to the Palestinian Territories

==== Asia and Pacific ====
- Almaty – Cluster Office to Kazakhstan, Kyrgyzstan, Tajikistan and Uzbekistan
- Apia – Cluster Office to Australia, Cook Islands, Fiji, Kiribati, Marshall Islands, Federated States of Micronesia, Nauru, New Zealand, Niue, Palau, Papua New Guinea, Samoa, Solomon Islands, Tonga, Tuvalu, Vanuatu and Tokelau (Associate Member)
- Bangkok – Regional Bureau for Education in Asia and the Pacific and Cluster Office to Thailand, Burma, Laos, Singapore and Vietnam
- Beijing – Cluster Office to North Korea, Japan, Mongolia, the People's Republic of China and South Korea
- Dhaka – National Office to Bangladesh
- Hanoi – National Office to Vietnam
- Islamabad – National Office to Pakistan
- Jakarta – Regional Bureau for Sciences in Asia and the Pacific and Cluster Office to the Philippines, Brunei, Indonesia, Malaysia, and East Timor
- Manila – National Office to the Philippines
- Kabul – National Office to Afghanistan
- Kathmandu – National Office to Nepal
- New Delhi – Cluster Office to Bangladesh, Bhutan, India, Maldives and Sri Lanka
- Phnom Penh – National Office to Cambodia
- Tashkent – National Office to Uzbekistan
- Tehran – Cluster Office to Afghanistan, Iran, Pakistan and Turkmenistan

==== Europe and North America ====
- Brussels – Liaison Office to the European Union and its subsidiary bodies in Brussels
- Geneva – Liaison Office to the United Nations in Geneva
- New York City – Liaison Office to the United Nations in New York
- Venice – Regional Bureau for Sciences and Culture in Europe

==== Latin America and the Caribbean ====
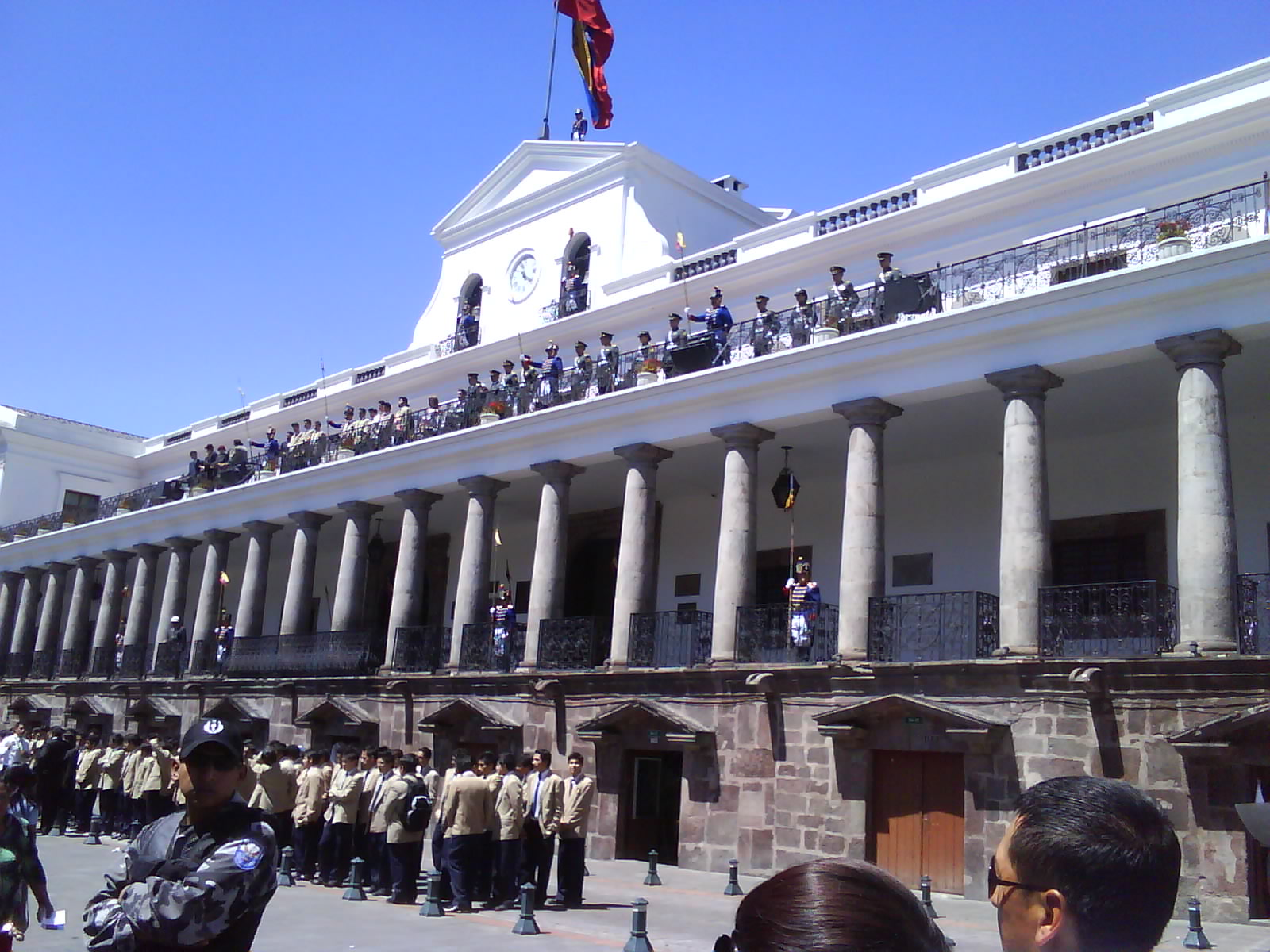
Carondelet Palace, Presidential Palace – with changing of the guards. The Historic Center of Quito, Ecuador, is one of the largest, least-altered and best-preserved historic centres in the Americas. This centre was, together with the historic centre of Kraków in Poland, the first to be declared World Heritage Site by UNESCO on 18 September 1978.

- Brasília – National Office to Brazil
- Guatemala City – National Office to Guatemala
- Havana – Regional Bureau for Culture in Latin America and the Caribbean and Cluster Office to Cuba, Dominican Republic, Haiti and Aruba
- Kingston – Cluster Office to Antigua and Barbuda, Bahamas, Barbados, Belize, Dominica, Grenada, Guyana, Jamaica, Saint Kitts and Nevis, Saint Lucia, Saint Vincent and the Grenadines, Suriname and Trinidad and Tobago as well as the associate member states of British Virgin Islands, Cayman Islands, Curaçao and Sint Maarten
- Lima – National Office to Peru
- Mexico City – National Office to Mexico
- Montevideo – Regional Bureau for Sciences in Latin America and the Caribbean and Cluster Office to Argentina, Brazil, Chile, Paraguay and Uruguay
- Port-au-Prince – National Office to Haiti
- Quito – Cluster Office to Bolivia, Colombia, Ecuador and Venezuela
- San José – Cluster Office to Costa Rica, El Salvador, Guatemala, Honduras, Mexico, Nicaragua and Panama
- Santiago de Chile – Regional Bureau for Education in Latin America and the Caribbean and National Office to Chile

=== Partner organizations ===
- International Committee of the Red Cross (ICRC) – Humanitarian non-governmental organization
- Blue Shield International (BSI) – International organization protecting cultural heritage
- International Council of Museums (ICOM) – Organization of museums and museum professionals founded in 1946
- International Council on Monuments and Sites (ICOMOS) – French cultural heritage organization
- International Institute of Humanitarian Law (IIHL) – Institute promoting the study and dissemination of international humanitarian law

== Emblem and Flag ==
=== Flag ===
Flag of UNESCO

The format consists of the white organization emblem on a blue background. The colors blue and white are the official colors of the United Nations.

=== Emblem ===
The emblem of the organization is stylized as Graeco-Roman temple and consists of the text UNESCO in white sans-serif fonts, each of which forms a column of a portico, set between a triangular pediment and three steps. It was designed at the request of the then Director-General Julian Huxley and was adopted by the General Conference of UNESCO in 1954 as the organization's official emblem and seal.

According to UNESCO, the temple represents the Parthenon. The letters represent the organisation's mandates and programmes, the steps represent human rights, the roof symbolises humanity's highest aspirations. A 2026 study, however, notes a lack of evidence for the idea that the original design was based on the Parthenon. Instead, it is argued that the association was first made by Greek culture minister Melina Mercouri in 1982 and later endorsed by the then Director-General Amadou-Mahtar M'Bow during a campaign for the return of the Parthenon Marbles.

=== Usage ===
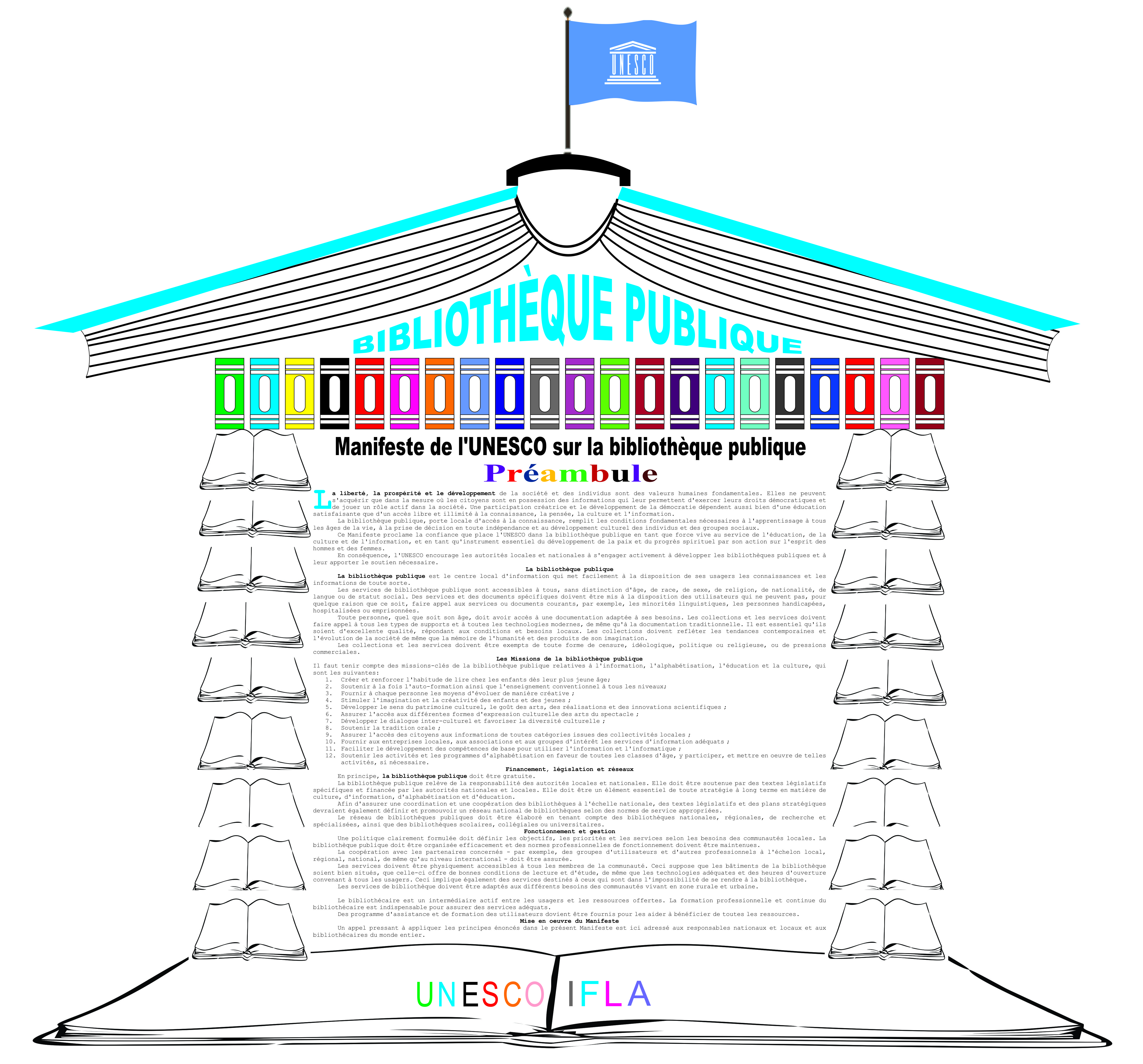
Art of a portico with the text of the UNESCO Public Library Manifesto

The UNESCO flag is displayed at schools that are part of the UNESCO Associated Schools Network. Some organisations such as the Australian Government's Department of Climate Change, Energy, the Environment and Water, prefer the use of the UNESCO symbol alongside the World Heritage Emblem.

== Controversies ==
=== New World Information and Communication Order ===
UNESCO has been the centre of controversy in the past, particularly in its relationships with the United States, the United Kingdom, Singapore and the former Soviet Union. During the 1970s and 1980s, UNESCO's support for a "New World Information and Communication Order" and its MacBride report calling for democratization of the media and more egalitarian access to information was condemned in these countries as attempts to curb freedom of the press. UNESCO was perceived as a platform for communists and Third World dictators to attack the West, in contrast to accusations made by the USSR in the late 1940s and early 1950s. In 1984, the United States withheld its contributions and withdrew from the organization in protest, followed by the United Kingdom in 1985. Singapore withdrew also at the end of 1985, citing rising membership fees. Following a change of government in 1997, the UK rejoined. The United States rejoined in 2003, followed by Singapore on 8 October 2007.

=== China ===
UNESCO has been criticized as being used by the People's Republic of China to present a Chinese Communist Party version of history and to dilute the contributions of ethnic minorities in China such as Uyghurs and Tibetans.

=== Israel ===
Israel was admitted to UNESCO in 1949, one year after its creation. Israel has maintained its membership since then. In 2010, Israel designated the Cave of the Patriarchs in Hebron and Rachel's Tomb in Bethlehem – both in the West Bank – as National Heritage Sites and announced restoration work, prompting criticism from the Obama administration and protests from Palestinians. In October 2010, UNESCO's executive board voted to declare the sites as "al-Haram al-Ibrahimi/Tomb of the Patriarchs" and "Bilal bin Rabah Mosque/Rachel's Tomb" and stated that they were "an integral part of the occupied Palestinian Territories" and any unilateral Israeli action was a violation of international law. UNESCO described the sites as significant to "people of the Muslim, Christian and Jewish traditions", and accused Israel of highlighting only the Jewish character of the sites. Israel in turn accused UNESCO of "detach[ing] the Nation of Israel from its heritage", and accused it of being politically motivated. The Rabbi of the Western Wall said that Rachel's tomb had not previously been declared a holy Muslim site. Israel partially suspended ties with UNESCO. Israeli Deputy Foreign Minister Danny Ayalon declared that the resolution was a "part of Palestinian escalation". Zevulun Orlev, chairman of the Knesset Education and Culture Committee, referred to the resolutions as an attempt to undermine the mission of UNESCO as a scientific and cultural organization that promotes cooperation throughout the world.

On 28 June 2011, UNESCO's World Heritage Committee, at Jordan's insistence, censured Israel's decision to demolish and rebuild the Mughrabi Gate Bridge in Jerusalem for safety reasons. Israel stated that Jordan had signed an agreement with Israel stipulating that the existing bridge must be dismantled for safety reasons; Jordan disputed the agreement, saying that it was only signed under U.S. pressure. Israel was also unable to address the UNESCO committee over objections from Egypt.

In January 2014, days before it was scheduled to open, UNESCO Director-General, Irina Bokova, "indefinitely postponed" and effectively cancelled an exhibit created by the Simon Wiesenthal Centre entitled "The People, The Book, The Land: The 3,500-year relationship between the Jewish people and the Land of Israel". The event was scheduled to run from 21 January through 30 January in Paris. Bokova cancelled the event after representatives of Arab states at UNESCO argued that its display would "harm the peace process". The author of the exhibition, professor Robert Wistrich of the Hebrew University's Vidal Sassoon International Center for the Study of Antisemitism, called the cancellation an "appalling act", and characterized Bokova's decision as "an arbitrary act of total cynicism and, really, contempt for the Jewish people and its history". UNESCO amended the decision to cancel the exhibit within the year, and it quickly achieved popularity and was viewed as a great success.

On 1 January 2019, Israel formally left UNESCO in pursuance of the US withdrawal over perceived continuous anti-Israel bias.

==== Occupied Palestine Resolution ====
On 13 October 2016, UNESCO passed a resolution on East Jerusalem that condemned Israel for "aggressions" by Israeli police and soldiers and "illegal measures" against the freedom of worship and Muslims' access to their holy sites, while also recognizing Israel as the occupying power. Palestinian leaders welcomed the decision. While the text acknowledged the "importance of the Old City of Jerusalem and its walls for the three monotheistic religions", it referred to the sacred hilltop compound in Jerusalem's Old City only by its Muslim name "Al-Haram al-Sharif", Arabic for Noble Sanctuary. In response, Israel denounced the UNESCO resolution for its omission of the words "Temple Mount" or "Har HaBayit", stating that it denies Jewish ties to the key holy site. After receiving criticism from numerous Israeli politicians and diplomats, including Benjamin Netanyahu and Ayelet Shaked, Israel froze all ties with the organization. The resolution was condemned by Ban Ki-moon and the Director-General of UNESCO, Irina Bokova, who said that Judaism, Islam and Christianity have clear historical connections to Jerusalem and "to deny, conceal or erase any of the Jewish, Christian or Muslim traditions undermines the integrity of the site. "Al-Aqsa Mosque [or] Al-Haram al-Sharif" is also Temple Mount, whose Western Wall is the holiest place in Judaism." It was also rejected by the Czech Parliament which said the resolution reflects a "hateful anti-Israel sentiment", and hundreds of Italian Jews demonstrated in Rome over Italy's abstention. On 26 October, UNESCO approved a reviewed version of the resolution, which also criticized Israel for its continuous "refusal to let the body's experts access Jerusalem's holy sites to determine their conservation status". Despite containing some softening of language following Israeli protests over a previous version, Israel continued to denounce the text. The resolution refers to the site Jews and Christians refer to as the Temple Mount, or Har HaBayit in Hebrew, only by its Arab name – a significant semantic decision also adopted by UNESCO's executive board, triggering condemnation from Israel and its allies. U.S. Ambassador Crystal Nix Hines stated: "This item should have been defeated. These politicized and one-sided resolutions are damaging the credibility of UNESCO."

In October 2017, the United States and Israel announced they would withdraw from the organization, citing in-part anti-Israel bias.

=== Palestine ===
==== Palestinian youth magazine controversy ====
In February 2011, an article was published in a Palestinian youth magazine in which a teenage girl described one of her four role models as Adolf Hitler. In December 2011, UNESCO, which partly funded the magazine, condemned the material and subsequently withdrew support.

==== Islamic University of Gaza controversy ====
In 2012, UNESCO decided to establish a chair at the Islamic University of Gaza in the field of astronomy, astrophysics, and space sciences, fueling controversy and criticism. Israel bombed the school in 2008 stating that they develop and store weapons there, which Israel restated in criticizing UNESCO's move.

The head, Kamalain Shaath, defended UNESCO, stating that "the Islamic University is a purely academic university that is interested only in education and its development". Israeli ambassador to UNESCO Nimrod Barkan planned to submit a letter of protest with information about the university's ties to Hamas, especially angry that this was the first Palestinian university that UNESCO chose to cooperate with. He never provided any evidence to support his claim of ties to Hamas. The Jewish organization B'nai B'rith criticized the move as well.

=== Listing Nanjing Massacre documents ===
In 2015, Japan threatened to halt funding of UNESCO because of the organization's decision to include documents related to the 1937 Nanjing massacre in the latest listing for its "Memory of the World" program. In October 2016, Japanese Foreign Minister Fumio Kishida confirmed that Japan's 2016 annual funding of ¥4.4 billion had been suspended, although he denied any direct link with the Nanjing document controversy.

=== United States and UNESCO ===
The United States withdrew from UNESCO in 1984, citing the "highly politicized" nature of the organization, its ostensible "hostility toward the basic institutions of a free society, especially a free market and a free press", as well as its "unrestrained budgetary expansion", and poor management under then Director-General Amadou-Mahtar M'Bow of Senegal.

On 19 September 1989, US Congressman Jim Leach stated before a congressional subcommittee:

The reasons for the withdrawal of the United States from UNESCO in 1984 are well-known; my view is that we overreacted to the calls of some who wanted to radicalize UNESCO, and the calls of others who wanted the United States to lead in emasculating the UN system. The fact is UNESCO is one of the least dangerous international institutions ever created. While some member countries within UNESCO attempted to push journalistic views antithetical to the values of the west, and engage in Israel bashing, UNESCO itself never adopted such radical postures. The United States opted for empty-chair diplomacy, after winning, not losing, the battles we engaged in... It was nuts to get out, and would be nuttier not to rejoin.

Leach concluded that the record showed Israel bashing, a call for a new world information order, money management, and arms control policy to be the impetuses behind the withdrawal; he asserted that before departing from UNESCO, a withdrawal from the IAEA had been pushed on him. On 1 October 2003, the United States rejoined UNESCO.

On 12 October 2017, the United States notified UNESCO it would again withdraw from the organization, on 31 December 2018; Israel followed suit. The Department of State cited "mounting arrears at UNESCO, the need for fundamental reform in the organization, and continuing anti-Israel bias at UNESCO".

The United States has not paid over $600 million in dues since it stopped paying its $80 million annual UNESCO dues when Palestine became a full member in 2011. Israel and the United States were among the 14 votes against the membership out of 194 member countries. When the United States announced it was rejoining the body in 2023, it also pledged to pay all past-due payments.

On 4 February 2025, the White House said to conduct a review of US membership in UNESCO. On 22 July, Donald Trump decided that US will again withdraw from UNESCO, effective at the end of 2026.

=== Kurdish–Turkish conflict ===
On 25 May 2016, Turkish poet and human rights activist Zülfü Livaneli resigned as Turkey's only UNESCO goodwill ambassador. He highlighted the human rights situation in Turkey and the destruction of the historical Sur district of Diyarbakir, the largest city in Kurdish-majority southeast Turkey, during fighting between the Turkish army and Kurdish militants as the main reasons for his resignation. Livaneli said: "To pontificate on peace while remaining silent against such violations is a contradiction of the fundamental ideals of UNESCO."

=== Campaigns against illicit art trading ===
In 2020 UNESCO stated that the size of the illicit trade in cultural property amounted to 10 billion dollars a year. A report that same year by the Rand Organization suggested the actual market is "not likely to be larger than a few hundred million dollars each year". An expert cited by UNESCO as attributing the 10 billion figure denied it, saying he had "no idea" where the figure came from. Art dealers were particularly critical of the UNESCO figure because it amounted to 15% of the total world art market.

In November 2020, part of a UNESCO advertising campaign intended to highlight international trafficking in looted artefacts had to be withdrawn after it falsely presented a series of museum-held artworks with known provenances as recently looted objects held in private collections. The adverts claimed that a head of Buddha in the Metropolitan Museum's collection since 1930 had been looted from a Kabul Museum in 2001 and then smuggled into the US art market, that a funerary monument from Palmyra that the Met had acquired in 1901 had been recently looted from the Palmyra Museum by Islamic State militants and then smuggled into the European antiquities market, and that an Ivory Coast mask with a provenance that indicates it was in the United States by 1954 was looted during armed clashes in 2010–2011. After complaints by the Met, the adverts were withdrawn.

== Products and services ==
- UNESDOC Database – Contains more than 146,000 UNESCO documents in full text published since 1945 as well as metadata from the collections of the UNESCO Library and documentation centres in field offices and institutes.

=== Information processing tools ===
UNESCO develops, maintains, and disseminates, free of charge, two interrelated software packages for database management (CDS/ISIS [not to be confused with UK police software package ISIS]) and data mining/statistical analysis (IDAMS).

- CDS/ISIS – a generalized information storage and retrieval system. The Windows version may run on a single computer or in a local area network. The JavaISIS client/server components allow remote database management over the Internet and are available for Windows, Linux, and Macintosh. Furthermore, GenISIS allows users to produce HTML Web forms for CDS/ISIS database searching. The ISIS_DLL provides an API for developing CDS/ISIS based applications.
- OpenIDAMS – a software package for processing and analysing numerical data developed, maintained and disseminated by UNESCO. The original package was proprietary, but UNESCO has initiated a project to provide it as open source.
- IDIS – a tool for direct data exchange between CDS/ISIS and IDAMS

== See also ==
- Academic mobility network – International university exchange program
- League of Nations archives – Collection of the historical records and official documents of the League of Nations
- UNESCO Intangible Cultural Heritage Lists
- UNESCO Reclining Figure 1957–58, sculpture by Henry Moore
- UniRef – Humanitarian organization based in Switzerland
- International Charter of Physical Education, Physical Activity and Sport – UNESCO charter promoting access to sport
- World Conference on Cultural Policies and Sustainable Development – High level UNESCO cultural policy meeting held every 4 years
