= Cultural exemption =

Principle in international economic law

The cultural exemption is a concept that originated in international economic law and more specifically in bilateral and regional free trade agreements. The cultural exemption takes the form of a clause that has the effect of excluding from its scope cultural goods and services that would otherwise be covered by the commitments arising from the agreement in question. The purpose of this clause is to preserve the state's power of intervention with respect to these cultural goods and services, and therefore to protect its cultural sovereignty.

== Definition ==
The terms cultural exemption and cultural exception are often used interchangeably. Although the legal technique is not exactly the same, both have the same objective, namely to remove cultural goods and services from the scope of a trade agreement to preserve the power of state intervention.

The Canadian cultural exemption clause is the counterpart of the European cultural exception clause. In substance, the difference between the two clauses is essentially in their scope: while the Canadian cultural exemption excludes cultural industries from the scope of an economic agreement, the European cultural exception is more restrictive, in that it generally covers only audiovisual services.

Cultural exemptions and exceptions fall under the broader category of cultural clauses, which encompass a variety of provisions that refer to culture to recognize the specificity of this sector in a free trade context. These clauses share the objective of conveying the idea that culture is not a mere commodity. They are "the best way to make culture and trade coexist within the global legal order ". In some free trade agreements, one or more explicit or implicit references to the 2005 Convention on the Protection and Promotion of the Diversity of Cultural Expressions, and sometimes to some of its objectives, principles or obligations, are added to cultural clauses.

Unlike cultural reservations or commitments with limitations on the cultural sector, cultural exceptions or exemptions have the advantage of being permanently incorporated into an agreement. As a result, they are generally not subject to subsequent negotiations aimed at progressively increasing the level of liberalization generated by a trade agreement.

In the case of free trade agreements negotiated by Canada, the cultural exemption can vary in scope. In a majority of agreements, it applies to the entire treaty. In other agreements, it is incorporated into certain chapters only, meaning that it excludes only certain cultural goods or services from the scope of the treaty.

Finally, the scope of a cultural exemption or cultural exception can be modulated according to the definitions of the cultural goods, services or industries to which these clauses refer.

The need for separate treatment of cultural products in a context of trade liberalization is analyzed on a case-by-case basis.

== Cultural exemption and the multilateral trading system ==
Fearing the strength of the Hollywood film market after the First World War, some European countries adopted measures to protect their audiovisual and film industries, notably by means of screen quotas. When negotiating what was to become the General Agreement on Tariffs and Trade (GATT 1947), some parties wanted to incorporate a provision allowing for the maintenance of these quotas. The effect of Article IV of GATT 1947 is precisely to permit the maintenance of certain types of "screen quotas".

This clause will be "symptomatic" of the possible restrictive vision of the cultural clauses (of cultural exception), which would apply only to audiovisual services. The general exceptions of the GATT 1947 will be considered insufficient (or too uncertain) to ensure the protection of the cultural sovereignty of states. Indeed, the only general exception in the GATT that concerns the cultural sector is limited to preserving the power of states to adopt and implement measures "imposed for the protection of national treasures of artistic, historic or archaeological value".

During the Uruguay Round negotiations (1986–1994) in which the multilateral trade system was reformed, a special group on audiovisual services was set up with a mandate to determine the rules to be applied to the audiovisual services sector in the framework of the General Agreement on Trade in Services (GATS). The possibility of excluding this sector through a cultural clause is being considered. Faced with strong opposition from the United States, the scope of the GATS eventually covered all services, including audiovisual services. However, this agreement is based on the principle of progressive liberalization, which relies on the elaboration of so-called "positive" schedules of commitments, specifically with regard to market access and national treatment obligations. The GATS thus offers a certain flexibility to make, or not, these two types of commitments for any service, including audiovisual or other cultural services.

Many WTO members take advantage of this flexibility to refrain from making market access and national treatment commitments for audiovisual services. Only the United States and New Zealand have a schedule of substantive commitments on cultural services. Other members, including China, India and Australia, are liberalizing trade in certain audiovisual services, while limiting their scope through references to this effect in their schedules of commitments.

From 1995 to 1997, the member states of the Organization for Economic Cooperation and Development (OECD) attempted to negotiate a Multilateral Agreement on Investment (MAI). Once again, defenders of the cultural exception opposed the inclusion of the cultural sector in the scope of this future agreement, while the United States took a position similar to that adopted during the Uruguay Round negotiations.

In the wake of these debates, civil society is mobilizing. The first Coalition for Cultural Diversity was born in this context in Montreal. It became "one of the most effective and influential spokespersons in Canada" for the recognition of the specificity of cultural goods and services in trade agreements.

== Cultural exemption and the work of UNESCO ==
Following the conclusion of the Uruguay Round and the aborted attempt to exclude audiovisual services from the GATS, the debate on the recognition of the specificity of cultural products moved to UNESCO. Discussions on this subject led first to the adoption in 2001 of the Universal Declaration on Cultural Diversity, and then in 2005 of the Convention on the Protection and Promotion of the Diversity of Cultural Expressions ("the 2005 Convention"). This instrument quickly received wide recognition. It now has 149 Parties: 148 states and the European Union.

France, along with Canada and Quebec, were the main instigators of this process. However, the negotiations of the 2005 Convention were stormy due to the strong and sustained opposition of the United States. One of the main points of tension concerned the negotiation of the clauses that would specify the relationship between the convention and other international legal instruments, including trade agreements. This negotiation culminated in the adoption of articles 20 and 21 of the convention, which place all international legal instruments on an equal footing, while requiring the parties to promote the objectives and principles of the convention in other international fora.

After two years of negotiations that began in 2003, the convention was adopted by an overwhelming majority of 148 states (with only two states opposing it (the United States and Israel) and four states abstaining from voting (Australia, Honduras, Nicaragua, and Liberia).

The 2005 Convention also recognizes the dual nature of cultural goods and services and reaffirms the sovereign right of parties to adopt cultural policies of their own choosing. It also pursues the objective of rebalancing cultural exchanges, in particular to the benefit of the cultural expressions of developing countries.

Finally, the convention marks a certain paradigm shift in the way the specificity of cultural goods and services is affirmed within the international legal order, moving from the traditional position of excluding this sector from trade agreements to a more positive and inclusive approach, that of protecting and promoting the diversity of cultural expressions.
