= Cultural expressions =

Creative manifestation of the cultural identity of its author

Cultural expressions are creative manifestations of the cultural identities of their authors. They are treated in the international legal system in terms of cultural rights, intellectual property law and international trade.

== Definition ==
The objective of the 2005 Convention on the Protection and Promotion of the Diversity of Cultural Expressions is, as its title indicates, to protect and promote the diversity of cultural expressions. The achievement of such objectives requires respect for all cultures, the reaffirmation of the cultural sovereignty of states, the recognition of the dual nature of cultural goods and services (as having both economic and cultural value), and the rebalancing of cultural exchanges through the strengthening of international cooperation and solidarity measures.

The concept of cultural expression is central to the 2005 Convention, which provides a definition:

Cultural expressions are those expressions which result from the creativity of individuals, groups and societies, and which have a cultural content.

The definition of cultural expression emphasizes content over the means and modes of cultural expression. It can be read in conjunction with two other definitions, that of cultural content and that of cultural activities, goods and services:

Cultural content refers to the symbolic meaning, artistic dimension and cultural values that originate from or express cultural identities. Cultural activities, goods and services refers to those activities, goods and services that, when considered from the point of view of their specific quality, use or purpose, embody or convey cultural expressions, irrespective of the commercial value they may have. Cultural activities may be an end in themselves, or they may contribute to the production of cultural goods and services.

Thus, expressions are cultural to the extent that they carry meaning, value and identity and can be conveyed, expressed, through cultural activities, goods or services. They can come from individuals, groups or societies.

Activities, goods or services have a dual economic and cultural value. The cultural and economic aspects are interdependent; they both contribute to the existence, development and preservation of diversity.

To identify the scope of what constitutes cultural goods and services, one can refer to the non-exhaustive list annexed to the Preliminary Draft of the Convention on the Protection and Promotion of the Diversity of Cultural Expressions, published in 2004.

Here are some examples of cultural expressions:

- Literature, film, music, media and visual arts;
- Live arts, performing arts (theater);
- Photography and video games, especially those with narrative content. Video games with narrative content can be included as a form of language, a variation of the term expression.

As permitted by the Vienna Convention on the Law of Treaties, the notion of cultural expressions is further defined by state practice and use of the term. In the context of the Convention on the Protection and Promotion of the Diversity of Cultural Expressions, this practice is reflected in the quadrennial reports produced by the parties.

In the digital environment, cultural expressions are interpreted in the same way. They are also endowed with cultural content and carry a double value, cultural and economic. The digital environment can serve as a catalyst for dissemination and production, offering new forms of cultural expression, but it also represents a challenge for the diversity of cultural expressions.

The cultural covered by the 2005 Convention may be linked to some forms of traditional cultural expressions but the latter are subject to their own rules. More generally, the preservation of cultural heritage, traditional knowledge and traditional cultural expressions is covered by other UNESCO conventions. With respect to the cultural expressions of indigenous peoples, the United Nations Declaration on the Rights of Indigenous Peoples specifically mentions the right of indigenous peoples to preserve, control, protect and develop their cultural heritage, knowledge and traditional expressions, as well as their right to collective intellectual property. The World Intellectual Property Organization (WIPO) has established a number of conventions on the protection of traditional cultural expressions. The World Intellectual Property Organization is continuing its work on a convention to recognize intellectual property rights in traditional knowledge and traditional cultural expressions.

== The emergence of the concept of cultural expressions within UNESCO ==
=== UNESCO's work on cultural diversity ===
To understand the concept of diversity of cultural expressions, we can look at the concept of cultural diversity. The notion of cultural diversity is multifaceted and has been the subject of UNESCO's work since its inception.

The UNESCO Universal Declaration on Cultural Diversity elevates the concept of cultural diversity to the status of common heritage of humanity in its very first article:

Culture takes diverse forms across time and space. This diversity is embodied in the originality and plurality of identities that characterize the groups and societies that make up humanity. As a source of exchange, innovation and creativity, cultural diversity is as necessary for humankind as biodiversity is for the living world. In this sense, it constitutes the common heritage of humanity and must be recognized and affirmed for the benefit of present and future generations.

Although it is non-binding, the Universal Declaration on Cultural Diversity has considerable legitimacy and symbolic force because it was adopted unanimously by the member states of UNESCO.

The Convention for the Safeguarding of the Intangible Cultural Heritage adopted in 2003 reiterates the concept of cultural diversity, this time within a binding legal instrument.

=== From cultural diversity to the diversity of cultural expressions ===
The diversity of cultural expressions is one aspect of cultural diversity that UNESCO is addressing. Cultural expression is seen as "[a] mode of communication [that] fills a basic need in every community... a key element in the adaptation of different cultures to the transformations imposed by globalization. The objectives of protecting and promoting the diversity of cultural expressions are part of the organization's mandate.

In the context of the negotiations of the Convention on the Protection and Promotion of the Diversity of Cultural Expressions, the concept of cultural expressions was born from the juxtaposition of the concepts of cultural content and artistic expressions. The original text read:

The term cultural expressions encompasses both the notions of cultural content and artistic expression and refers to the various ways in which cultural goods and services, as well as other cultural activities, can carry symbolic meaning or transmit cultural values. The cultural content of these goods, services and activities refers to the meaning or values thus conveyed. The artistic expression of these goods, services and activities refers to the cultural expression that results from aesthetic creativity or creation.

Five other options were proposed by the editorial board. Among these, we can mention the one that proceeds by enumeration:

OPTION 2: Cultural expressions are defined as the creative product of cultural initiatives intended to be presented to the public and which carry symbolic meanings or cultural values distinct from the commercial value of that product. This includes: (1) the product of individual creativity in the performing arts, visual arts and crafts; (2) sounds, images and texts in films, videos, sound recordings, books, magazines, broadcast programs and other forms of media, including multimedia, whether already in existence or yet to be invented; and (3) collections and exhibits in museums, art galleries and libraries, including the archives of a society's cultural heritage.

For the sake of simplicity and clarity, the concepts of cultural contents and artistic expressions were merged into cultural expressions. It was thus agreed that the terms culture and cultural diversity should be understood in their strict sense, i.e. in relation to the term cultural expressions, which should thus refer to a contemporary conception of cultural goods and services. The link between cultural diversity and diversity of cultural expressions is reflected in the Convention on the Protection and Promotion of the Diversity of Cultural Expressions. The convention contains this definition of cultural diversity :

cultural diversity refers to the multiplicity of forms in which the cultures of groups and societies find expression. These expressions are transmitted within and between groups and societies. Cultural diversity is manifested not only in the varied forms in which the cultural heritage of humankind is expressed, enriched and transmitted through the variety of cultural expressions, but also in the various modes of artistic creation, production, dissemination, distribution and enjoyment of cultural expressions, whatever the means and technologies used [...]

The last sentence refers to cultural expressions, which are a manifestation of cultural diversity. The 2001 Universal Declaration on Cultural Diversity states that the preservation of cultural diversity requires respect for fundamental human rights, particularly cultural rights. The 2005 Convention also recognizes this close relationship by articulating the principle of respect for human rights and fundamental freedoms that "[c]ultural diversity can only be protected and promoted if human rights and fundamental freedoms such as freedom of expression, information and communication, as well as the ability of individuals to choose cultural expressions, are guaranteed." To ensure cultural diversity, the 2005 Convention commits parties to adopt and implement measures to promote and protect cultural expressions. These measures take the form primarily of cultural policies.

== Traditional cultural expressions ==
The World Intellectual Property Organization (WIPO) defines traditional cultural expressions through examples:

Traditional cultural expressions, also known as "expressions of folklore," may include music, dance, art, designs, names, signs and symbols, performances, ceremonies, architectural works, handicrafts and stories, as well as many other artistic or cultural expressions.

Traditional cultural expressions:

- can be considered as the forms of expression of the traditional culture;
- are an integral part of the identity and heritage of a traditional or Aboriginal community;
- are passed on from generation to generation.

Traditional cultural expressions are an integral part of the cultural and social identity of indigenous and local communities, incorporating skills and techniques and conveying fundamental values and beliefs.

Their protection relates to the promotion of creativity, the enhancement of cultural diversity and the preservation of cultural heritage.

Although the definition is broad, some traditional cultural expressions do not fall within this framework. Traditional cultural expressions fall outside the scope of the 2005 Convention and the definition of cultural expressions set out in its Article 4. It is possible to address the issue of their protection and promotion using the concept of cultural diversity rather than intellectual property. This is a point of contact of the competences of WIPO and UNESCO, which is materialized through other international instruments such as the Convention for the Safeguarding of the Intangible Cultural Heritage, the UNESCO Universal Declaration on Cultural Diversity and the Convention concerning the Protection of the World Cultural and Natural Heritage, as well as the model provisions adopted by both institutions for the protection of expressions of folklore.

== Elements often equated with cultural expressions ==
The concept of cultural expressions in the Convention on the Protection and Promotion of the Diversity of Cultural Expressions is limited to a specific aspect of cultural diversity, namely the elements generated by cultural industries, and many elements are mistakenly or misunderstood as such. Considerations of tangible and intangible cultural heritage as well as intellectual property rights are outside the scope of the 2005 Convention because of the specific definition of cultural expressions.

Cultural expressions must also be distinguished from the fundamental rights components of freedom of expression, information and communication, and freedom of choice of cultural expressions, although they are, to some extent, interrelated.

There is sometimes some confusion about the scope of application of three major UNESCO cultural conventions: the Convention concerning the Protection of the World Cultural and Natural Heritage, the Convention for the Protection of the Intangible Cultural Heritage, and the 2005 Convention. Performing arts (traditional rites and dances), crafts, and cuisine are more examples of intangible cultural heritage. On the other hand, urban planning and design are part of the world's cultural heritage, but do not qualify as cultural expressions within the meaning of the 2005 Convention. Fashion, advertising and trademarks certainly relate to the creative industries. However, without excluding the possibility that some components could be included in the definition of cultural expressions, they are not covered a priori. Author Rostam J. Neuwirth suggests that the fashion industry, as a creative industry, may be indirectly affected by the 2005 Convention. The archival and library sectors are unique in that they were included in one of the options for defining cultural expressions suggested during the negotiations of the 2005 Convention. These sectors are critical to the preservation of cultural expressions. These sectors are essential to the issues of preservation, dissemination and access, but are considered peripheral to the notion of cultural expression. Moreover, they are more in line with the objectives of sustainability of intangible cultural heritage than of vitality of cultural expressions.

Recreational services, sports and games fall under the category of leisure and are not covered by the definition of cultural expressions. Some states qualify narrative video games as cultural expressions. Finally, language does not constitute a cultural expression, but a means of conveying it or, on the contrary, a barrier limiting access to it. Language can therefore be the subject of measures aimed at promoting the circulation and creation of cultural expressions, such as language quotas.
