= Masterpieces of the Oral and Intangible Heritage of Humanity =

UNESCO list established in 2001

The Proclamation of Masterpieces of the Oral and Intangible Heritage of Humanity was made by the Director-General of UNESCO starting in 2001 to raise awareness of intangible cultural heritage—such traditions, rituals, dance, and knowledge—and urge the protection of the communities that create them. Several manifestations of intangible heritage around the world were awarded the status of Masterpieces; further proclamations occurred biennially. The status exists to recognize the value of non-material culture, as well as to commit states to promote and safeguard the Masterpieces. In 2008, the 90 declared Masterpieces were incorporated into the new Representative List of the Intangible Cultural Heritage of Humanity as its first entries.

== Background ==
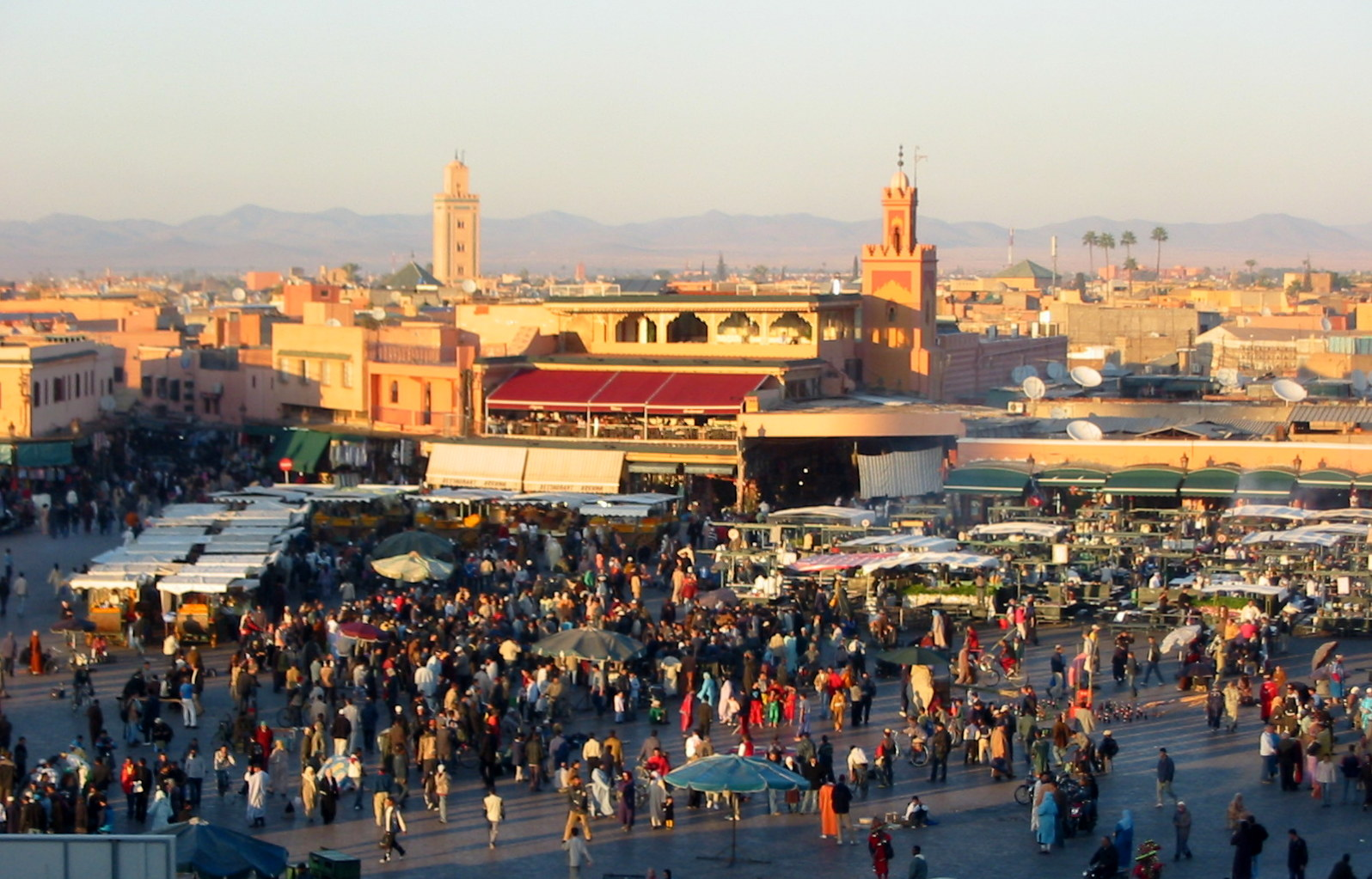
Citizens' protection of activities in Morocco's Djemaa el Fna Square inspired UNESCO's Masterpieces of the Oral and Intangible Heritage of Humanity label.

UNESCO defines oral and intangible heritage as "the totality of tradition-based creations of a cultural community expressed by a group or individuals and recognized as reflecting the expectations of a community in so far as they reflect its cultural and social identity." Language, literature, music and dance, games and sports, culinary traditions, rituals and mythologies, knowledge and practices concerning the universe, know-how linked to handicrafts, and cultural spaces are among the many forms of intangible heritage. Intangible heritage is seen as a repository of cultural diversity and creative expression, as well as a driving force for living cultures. Since it can be vulnerable to forces of globalization, social transformation, and intolerance, UNESCO encourages communities to identify, document, protect, promote and revitalize such heritage.

Upon the adoption of the Universal Declaration on Cultural Diversity in November 2001, UNESCO encouraged recognition and protection of intangible heritage in the same way as natural and cultural treasures of tangible heritage are protected.

UNESCO has, since 1972, maintained the World Heritage List to protect the world's cultural and natural heritage. This was directed mostly to the protection and representation of tangible, monumental elements of past cultures or the natural environment. The Masterpieces of the Oral and Intangible Heritage of Humanity is UNESCO's response to the call for a wider definition of cultural heritage that includes intangible aspects.

The idea for the project came from a campaign to preserve Morocco's Jeema' el Fna Square in Marrakesh. The square is known for traditional activities by storytellers, musicians and other performers, but it was threatened by economic development pressures. In fighting for the protection of traditions, the residents called for international recognition of the need to protect such places—termed cultural spaces—and other popular and traditional forms of cultural expression. The UNESCO label of Masterpieces of the Oral and Intangible Heritage of Humanity aims to raise awareness about the importance of oral and intangible heritage as an essential component of cultural diversity.

The spectacle of Djemaa el Fna is repeated daily and each day it is different. Everything changes – voices, sounds, gestures, the public which sees, listens, smells, tastes, touches. The oral tradition is framed by one much vaster – that we can call intangible. The Square, as a physical space, shelters a rich oral and intangible tradition.

— Juan Goytisolo, in a speech delivered at the opening meeting for the First Proclamation, 15 May 2001

== Proclamations ==
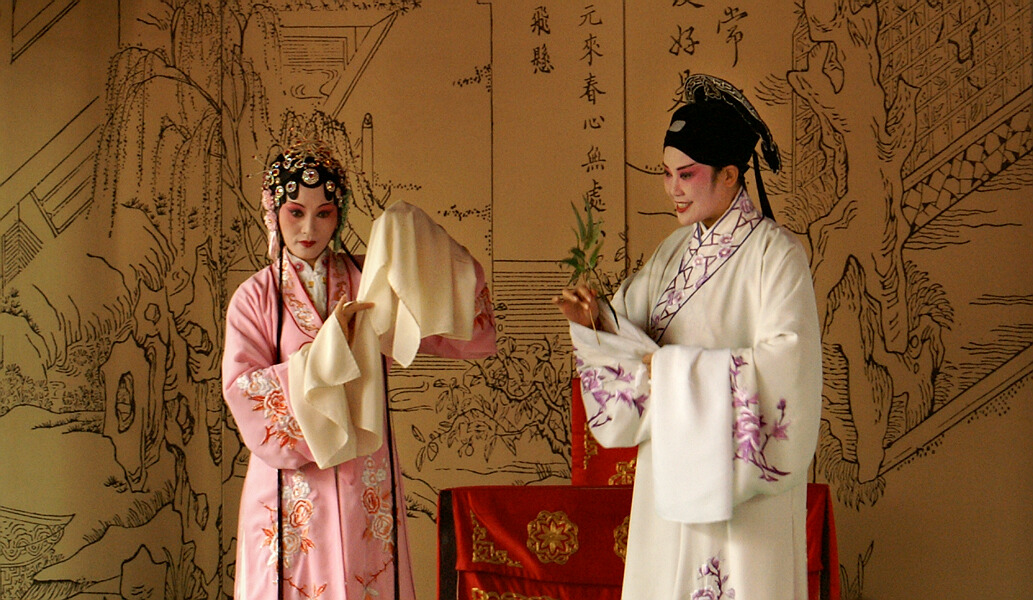
China's Kunqu opera typically features roles such as a young male lead, a female lead, an old man and various comedic characters, all dressed in traditional costumes, and it is characterized by its "dynamic structure and melody (kunqiang)".

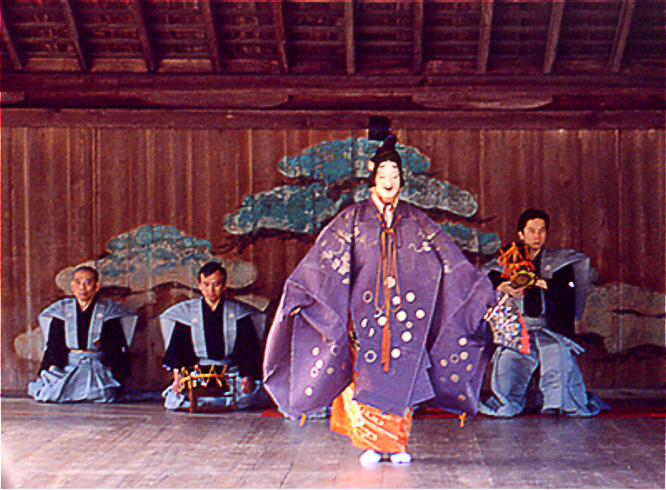
Nōgaku is the principal form of Japanese theatre and has influenced the Bunraku, or Japanese puppet theatre as well as Kabuki. All three have been proclaimed by UNESCO as Masterpieces of the Oral and Intangible Heritage of Humanity.

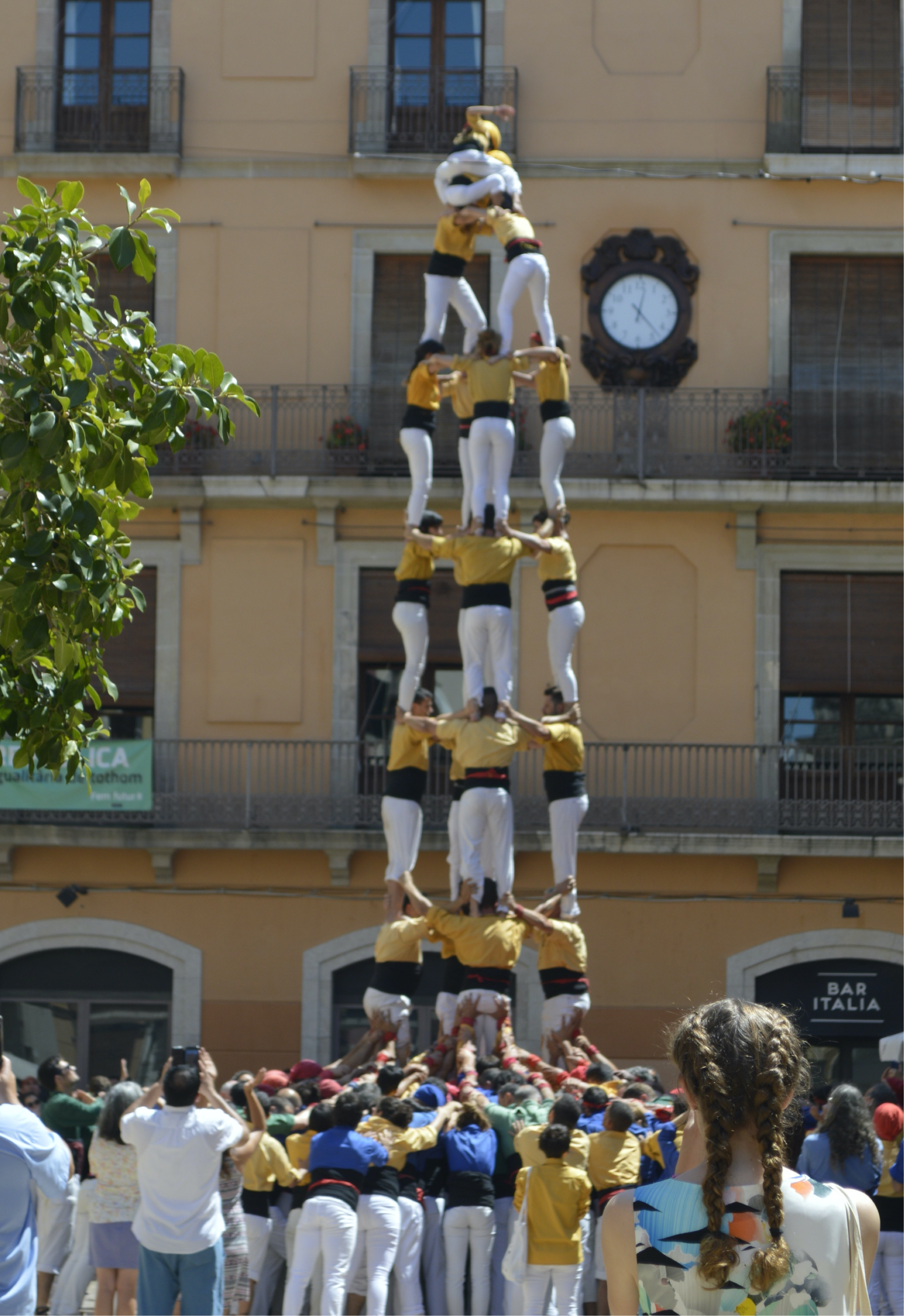
Castells, one of the most representative traditions in the Catalan culture, is among the proclaimed Masterpieces in Catalonia, Spain in 2010.

In 2001, the new program started identifying various forms of intangible heritage around the world for safeguarding. Under this act, UNESCO member states are each allowed to submit a single example of intangible cultural heritage within their territories. Multi-national nominations are also possible. The nominated intangible heritage may fall into two categories as set by the program:

- forms of popular and traditional cultural expressions; or
- cultural spaces, i.e., places where cultural and popular activities are concentrated and regularly take place (markets squares, festivals, etc.)

The nominations are evaluated by a panel of experts in intangible heritage, including specialized non-government organizations (NGOs), and are further scrutinized by a jury whose 18 members have been selected by the UNESCO Director-General. The cultural expressions and spaces proposed for proclamation have to:

1. demonstrate their outstanding value as masterpiece of the human creative genius;
2. give wide evidence of their roots in the cultural tradition or cultural history of the community concerned;
3. be a means of affirming the cultural identity of the cultural communities concerned;
4. provide proof of excellence in the application of the skill and technical qualities displayed;
5. affirm their value as unique testimony of living cultural traditions;
6. be at risk of degradation or of disappearing.

The nominees should be in conformity with UNESCO ideals, in particular, with the Universal Declaration of Human Rights. The nomination proposals also have to provide proof of the full involvement and agreement of the local communities and to include an action plan for the safeguarding or promotion of the concerned cultural spaces or expressions. This plan has to be developed in close collaboration with the tradition bearers.

Through the nomination process, the member states are encouraged to compile an inventory of their intangible heritage, raising awareness and protection of these treasures. In turn, the proclaimed masterpieces receive commitment from UNESCO in financing plans for their conservation.

Proclamations in 2001, 2003, and 2005, designated a total of 90 forms of intangible heritage around the world as masterpieces:

Proclamation	Date	Jury president	Number of candidature files received	Number of Masterpieces proclaimed	Reference
1st	May 18, 2001	Juan Goytisolo (Spain)	32	19	
2nd	November 7, 2003	Juan Goytisolo (Spain)	56	28	
3rd	November 25, 2005	Princess Basma Bint Talal (Jordan)	64	43	

== Current status ==
The increasing number of candidature files received and number of Masterpieces proclaimed every two years meant that UNESCO's goal of raising awareness on the importance of the protection of intangible heritage has been achieved. The rise in the number of participating member states led to the 2003 adoption of the Convention for the Safeguarding of the Intangible Cultural Heritage, which took effect in 2008. The standard-setting instrument was meant to complement the 1972 World Heritage Convention in its protection of intangible culture. Following the successful example of the World Heritage Convention's World Heritage List program, UNESCO established the Representative List of the Intangible Cultural Heritage of Humanity. This superseded the proclamation program when the convention took effect in 2008. All the 90 previously proclaimed masterpieces, which would be called elements, were featured as the first entries on the new list.

The process for designating an element for the list follows similar steps to the proclamation. The former role of the jury was supplanted by a new body known as the Intergovernmental Committee for the Safeguarding of Intangible Cultural Heritage.

In addition, UNESCO established a separate program, the List of Intangible Cultural Heritage in Need of Urgent Safeguarding, which highlights cultural expressions at risk despite efforts of the local community to preserve and protect them. These expressions cannot be expected to survive without immediate safeguarding; UNESCO also established an emergency fund for their preservation.

In 2003, UNESCO drafted the Convention for the Safeguarding of the Intangible Cultural Heritage, which provides an international framework, source of funding, and strategic overview for the further identification and protection of these masterpieces and other intangible cultural heritages. The convention went into force in 2006 and has since been approved by over 130 members.
