= Cultural exception =

Political concept

Cultural exception (French: l'exception culturelle) is a political concept introduced by France in General Agreement on Tariffs and Trade (GATT) negotiations in 1993 to treat culture differently from other commercial products. In other words, its purpose is to consider cultural goods and services as exceptions in international treaties and agreements especially with the World Trade Organization (WTO). Its goals are to point out that States are sovereign as far as limitation of culture free trade is concerned in order to protect and promote their artists and other elements of their culture. Concretely, it can be seen through protectionist measures limiting the diffusion of foreign artistic work (quotas) or through subsidies distributed according to the country's cultural policy.

== GATT negotiations (1993) ==
In 1992, some countries had voiced their concerns during the final negotiations of the Uruguay Round that implementation of the GATT principles on cultural goods and services "would undermine their cultural specificity (and unique status), in favour of their commercial aspects".

The purpose of Cultural exception is to treat cultural goods and services differently from other traded goods and services because of the intrinsic differences of such goods and services. Many countries defended the fact that cultural goods and services "encompass values, identity and meanings that go beyond their strictly commercial value". It notably allowed France to maintain quotas and subsidies to protect its cultural market from other nation's cultural products, most notably American, on television and radio. South Korean policy in favor of its movie industry is another example of how cultural exception is used to protect the audiovisual market.

First the debate concerned mainly audiovisual products. Secondly, in the WTO liberalization process, every country decides which sectors it will deregulate. Audiovisual services is one of the sectors where the number of WTO members with commitments is the lowest (30, as of 31 January 2009) (Source: WTO)

== 1994 NAFTA ==
In 1994, Canada included a cultural exemption clause in the North American Free Trade Agreement.

== MAI ==
Draft agreement negotiated between members of the Organisation for Economic Co-operation and Development (OECD) in 1995–1998, The Multilateral Agreement on Investment or MAI's ostensible purpose was to develop multilateral rules that would ensure international investment was governed in a more systematic and uniform way between states. After an intense global campaign was waged against the MAI by the treaty's critics, the host nation France announced in October 1998 that it would not support the agreement, effectively preventing its adoption due to the OECD's consensus procedures. The French government had identified respect for cultural differences as a requirement for French support for the agreement.

== The French Cultural Exception ==
France has been especially notable in pursuing the policy of cultural exception and its stance has sometimes attracted criticism. It was pursued by André Malraux in the post-second world war period when he was French minister of culture. In each branch of culture there is an automatic subsidy system for creative works. One example of these measures is the National Center of Cinematography and the moving image, which taxes cinema ticket sales and uses those funds to help the production or distribution of French cinema. Another example of protectionist measures is the audiovisual law (Loi sur l'audiovisuel) which specified for instance that "radio has to broadcast 40% French songs and, within this quota, 20% new talents."

The effects of this policy in France is suggested by the fact that between 2005 and 2011, between 45% and 55% of its film products were American imports, compared to 60 to 90% American imports in other European film markets.

== Cultural diversity at UNESCO ==
Cultural exception has been gradually replaced by the more consensual concept of cultural diversity as shows the adoption in October 2005, of UNESCO's Convention on the Protection and Promotion of the Diversity of Cultural Expressions (which followed the Universal Declaration on Cultural Diversity). Sponsored by France and Canada, the convention was passed 148-2, with four nations abstaining from voting. The United States and Israel voted against the proposal.

The UNESCO Convention on the Protection and Promotion of the Diversity of Cultural Expressions is a legally binding international agreement that supports Member-States' wills to assert their right in applying cultural policies and measures that exclude cultural goods and services from international trade agreements.

The United States claims that cultural exception is a form of protectionism that harms global trade and that the UNESCO Convention deals with such protectionism rather than cultural diversity. In addition, it claims that the UNESCO Convention allows for oppressive governments to suppress minority cultural voices. The film industry and other cultural industries in the United States are also against the concept of cultural exception, as it harms their export market, and have lobbied the United States to take its current position against cultural exception.

== See also ==
- Canadian cultural protectionism
- Convention on the Protection and Promotion of the Diversity of Cultural Expressions
- Cultural Diversity
- Universal Declaration on Cultural Diversity
