= Cultural diversity =

Quality of diverse or different cultures

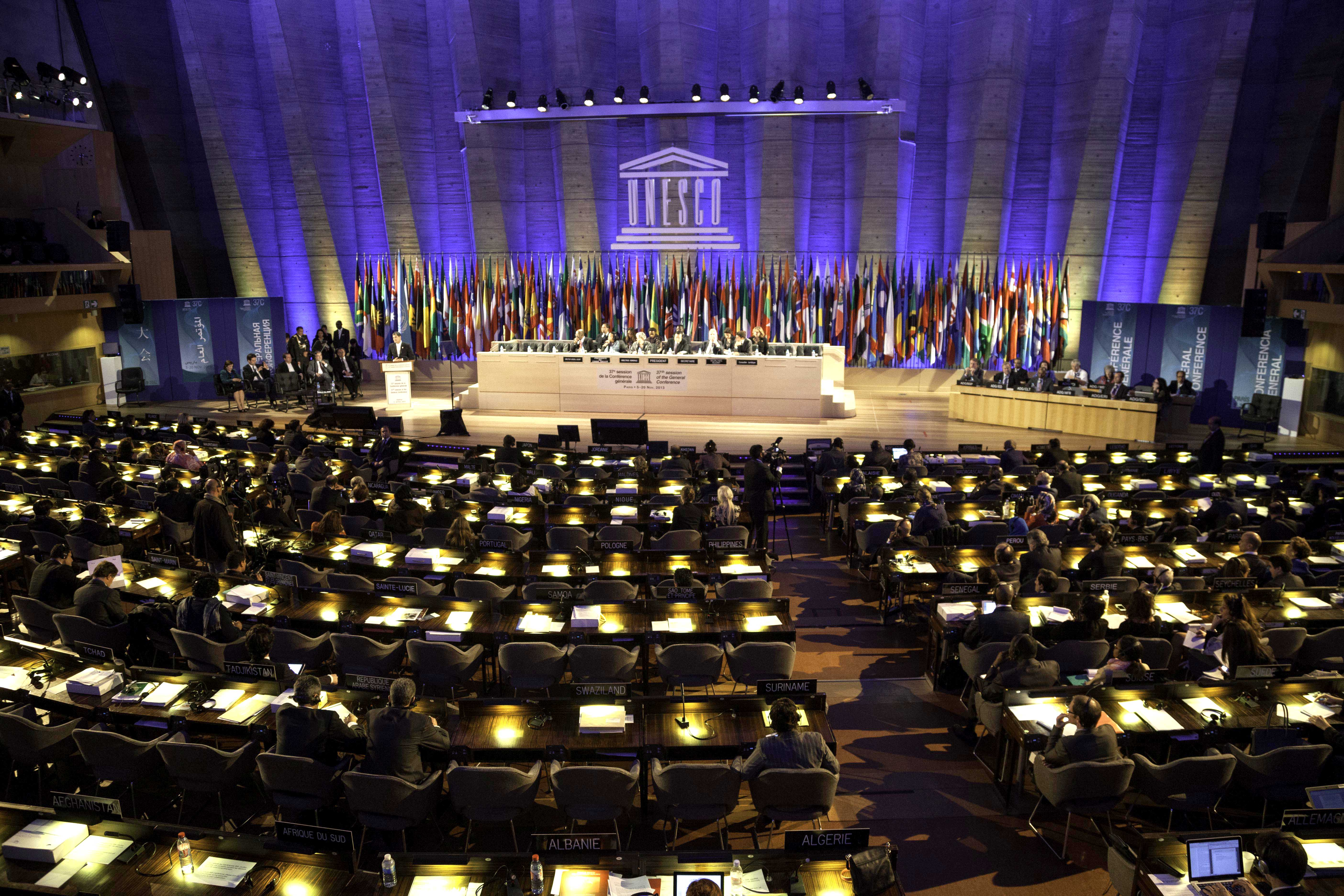
37th General Assembly of UNESCO in 2013, Paris

Cultural diversity is the quality of diverse or different cultures, as opposed to monoculture. It has a variety of meanings in different contexts, sometimes applying to cultural products like art works in museums or entertainment available online, and sometimes applying to the variety of human cultures or traditions in a specific region, or in the world as a whole. It can also refer to the inclusion of different cultural perspectives in an organization or society.

Cultural diversity can be affected by political factors such as censorship or the protection of the rights of artists, and by economic factors such as free trade or protectionism in the market for cultural goods. Since the middle of the 20th century, there has been a concerted international effort to protect cultural diversity, involving the United Nations Educational, Scientific and Cultural Organization (UNESCO) and its member states. This involves action at international, national, and local levels. Cultural diversity can also be promoted by individual citizens in the ways they choose to express or experience culture.

== Characteristics ==
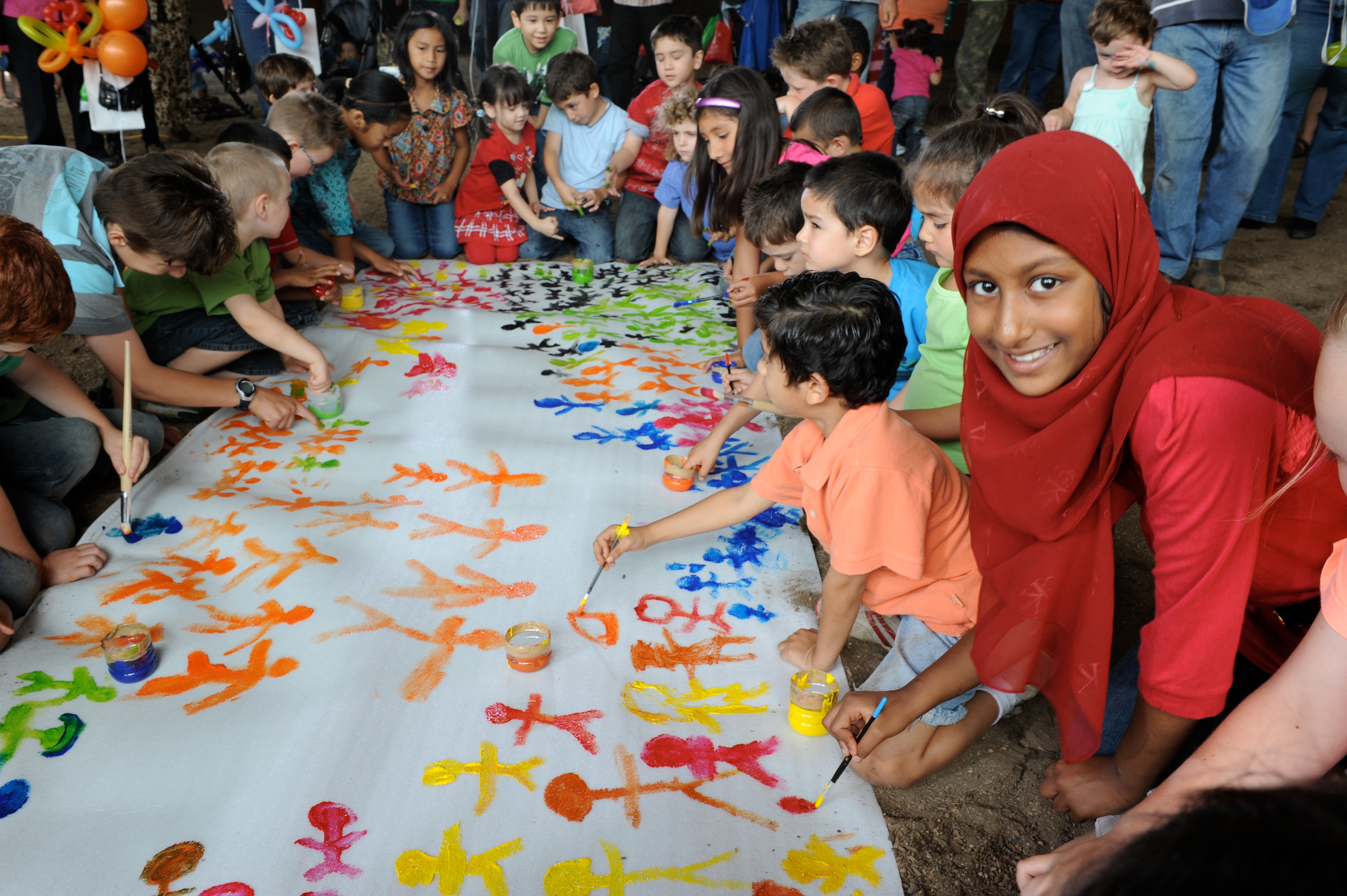
Harmony Day is dedicated to celebrating Australia's cultural diversity.

In the context of national and international efforts to promote or preserve cultural diversity, the term applies to five overlapping domains:

- economic: the availability of diverse cultural goods or services,
- artistic: the variety of artistic genres and styles that coexist,
- participatory: the participation of diverse ethnic groups in a nation's culture,
- heritage: the diversity of cultural traditions that are represented in heritage institutions such as museums, and
- multicultural: the variety of ethnic groups and their traditions that are visible in a country.

Of these five, the economic meaning has come to dominate in international negotiations. Nations have principally looked to protect cultural diversity by strengthening the ability of their domestic cultural industries to sell goods or services. Since the 1990s, UNESCO has mainly used "cultural diversity" for the international aspects of diversity, preferring the term "cultural pluralism" for diversity within a country.

Governments and international bodies use "cultural diversity" in both a broad and a narrow sense. The broad meaning takes its inspiration from anthropology. It includes lifestyles, value systems, traditions, and beliefs in addition to creative works. It emphasises an ongoing process of interaction and dialogue between cultures. This meaning has been promoted to the international community by UNESCO, since the 2001 Universal Declaration on Cultural Diversity. In practice, governments use a narrower, more traditional, meaning that focuses on the economic domain mentioned above.

In the international legal context, cultural diversity has been described as analogous to biodiversity. The General Conference of UNESCO took this position in 2001, asserting in Article 1 of the Universal Declaration on Cultural Diversity that "cultural diversity is as necessary for humankind as biodiversity is for nature". The authors John Cavanagh and Jerry Mander took this analogy further, describing cultural diversity as "a sort of cultural gene pool to spur innovation toward ever higher levels of social, intellectual and spiritual accomplishment."

Some descriptions of cultural diversity have been criticized as cultural essentialism.

== Quantification ==
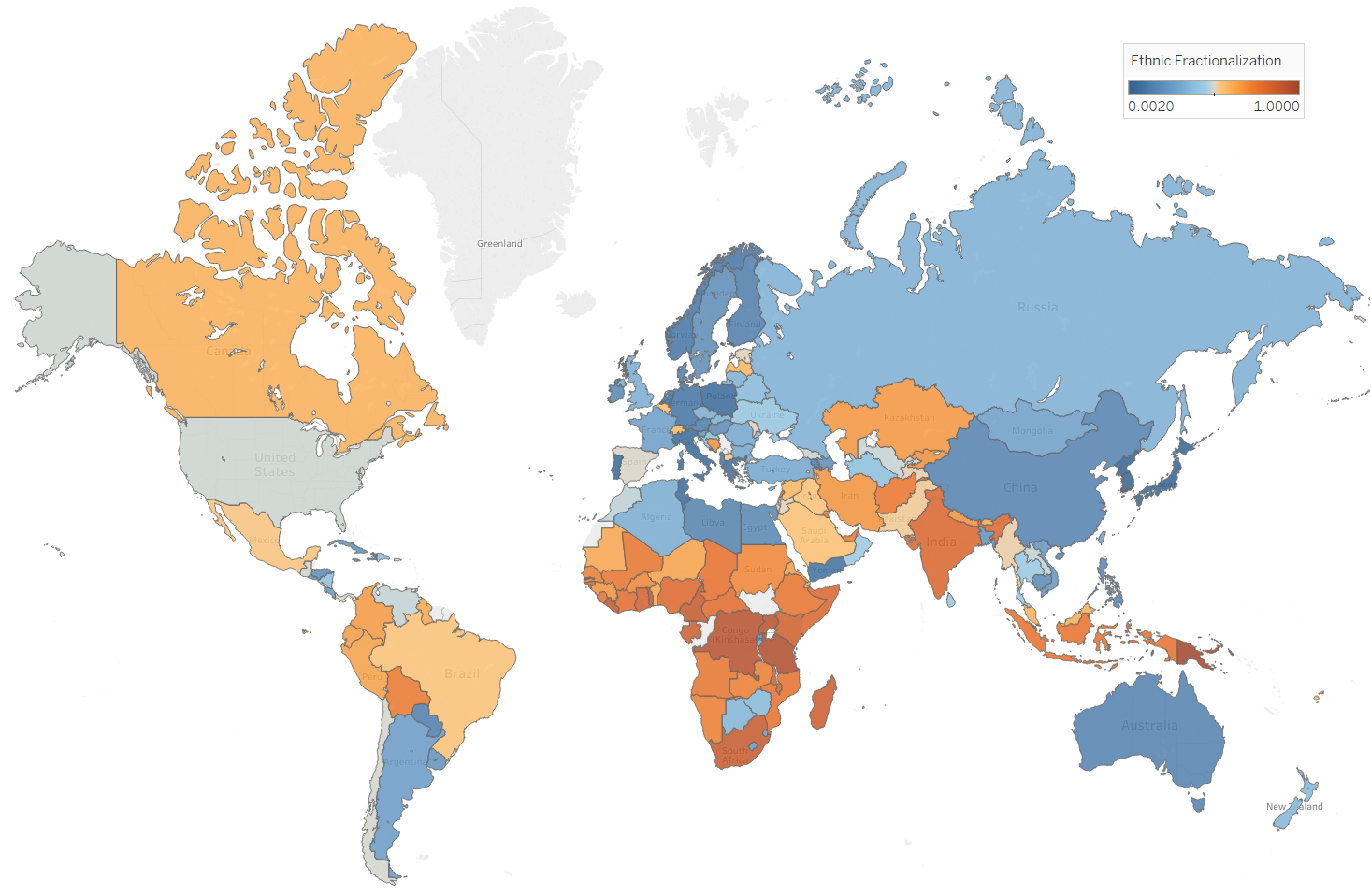
Countries ranked by ethnic and cultural diversity level; blue is lower and orange is higher

Cultural diversity is difficult to quantify. One measure of diversity is the number of identifiable cultures. The United Nations Department of Economic and Social Affairs reports that, although their numbers are relatively small, indigenous peoples account for 5,000 distinct cultures and thus the majority of the world's cultural diversity.

Another aspect of cultural diversity is measured by counting the number of languages spoken in a region or in the world as a whole. By this measure, the world's cultural diversity is rapidly declining. Research carried out in the 1990s by David Crystal suggested that at that time, on average, one language was falling into disuse every two weeks. He calculated that if that rate of the language death were to continue, then by the year 2100, more than 90% of the languages currently spoken in the world will have gone extinct.

In 2003, James Fearon of Stanford University published, in the Journal of Economic Growth, a list of countries based on the diversity of ethnicities, languages, and religions.

== International legal context ==
At the international level, the notion of cultural diversity has been defended by UNESCO since its founding in 1945, through a succession of declarations and legal instruments.

Many of the international legal agreements addressing cultural diversity were focused on intellectual property rights, and thus on tangible cultural expressions that can be bought or sold. The World Heritage List, established in 1972 by UNESCO, mainly listed architectural features and monuments. In the late 20th century, the diplomatic community recognised a need to protect intangible cultural heritage: the traditions, social structures, and skills that support creative expression. International efforts to define and protect this aspect of culture began with the 1989 UNESCO Recommendation on the Safeguarding of Traditional Culture and Folklore. UNESCO's Proclamation of Masterpieces of the Oral and Intangible Heritage of Humanity began in 2001, highlighting specific masterpieces to promote the responsibility of nations to protect intangible cultural heritage. Further proclamations were added in 2003 and 2005, bringing the total number of masterpieces to ninety. In 2001, UNESCO also hosted expert meetings to create a definition of intangible cultural heritage and a more legally binding treaty to protect it, resulting in the Convention for the Safeguarding of the Intangible Cultural Heritage. This was passed in 2003 and came into force in 2006. One result of this convention was the 2008 creation of UNESCO Representative List of Intangible Heritage, which incorporated the masterpieces from the 2001, 2003, and 2005 proclamations.

The first international instrument enshrining the value of cultural diversity and intercultural dialogue was the UNESCO Universal Declaration on Cultural Diversity, adopted unanimously in 2001. It calls on nations and institutions to work together for the preservation of culture in all its forms, and for policies that help to share ideas across cultures and inspire new forms of creativity. UNESCO no longer interpreted "culture" in terms of artistic masterpieces. With the Universal Declaration, it adopted a more expansive understanding based on anthropology. This defined cultural diversity as "the set of distinctive spiritual, material, intellectual, and emotional features of society or a social group", including lifestyles, value systems, traditions, and beliefs. The twelve articles of the Universal Declaration were published with an action plan for ways to promote cultural diversity. This action plan connected cultural diversity explicitly to human rights including freedom of expression, freedom of movement, and protection of indigenous knowledge. The declaration identifies cultural diversity as a source of innovation and creativity, as well as a driver of both economic development and personal development. UNESCO made a submission to a 2002 UN report on Human Rights and Cultural Diversity, quoting part of the declaration to emphasise that cultural diversity must not be used to infringe the rights of minorities and that cultural diversity requires the protection of individual freedoms.

Citing the Universal Declaration, the United Nations General Assembly established the World Day for Cultural Diversity for Dialogue and Development in December 2002. This continues to be celebrated on May 21 each year.

The Convention for the Safeguarding of the Intangible Cultural Heritage drew attention to increasing cultural homogenization by economic globalization and motivated UNESCO to negotiate a treaty protecting cultural diversity. The resulting Convention on the Protection and Promotion of the Diversity of Cultural Expressions (the "2005 Convention") was adopted in October 2005. This was the first international treaty to establish rights and obligations specifically relating to culture. The convention builds on the 2001 declaration by naming linguistic diversity as a fundamental part of cultural diversity and stating that cultural diversity depends on the free flow of ideas. To date, 151 signatory states, as well as the European Union, have registered their ratification of the convention, or a legally equivalent process.

The 2005 Convention created an International Fund for Cultural Diversity (IFCD), funded by voluntary contributions. This makes funding available to developing countries that are parties to the convention for specific activities that develop their cultural policies and cultural industries. As of April 2023, UNESCO reports that 140 projects in 69 developing countries have been carried out with funding from the IFCD.

== Factors ==
Cultural policy scholar Johnathan Vickery has observed that cultural diversity, like biological diversity, is continually under threat from various factors. Cultural diversity, linguistic diversity and species diversity show a partially comparable pattern. These threats often come from other cultural expressions, as when imported entertainment undermines interest in a nation's own culture. Other examples he mentions include religious revivals and modern Western education systems. Factors that promote a country's cultural diversity include migration and a nation's openness to discussing and celebrating cultural differences (which is itself an aspect of culture).

The actions of governments, international bodies, and civil society (meaning non-governmental and cultural sector organisations) can promote or restrict cultural diversity. As part of the international effort to promote and preserve cultural diversity, the 2005 Convention established processes to monitor progress towards a favourable environment, including global reports every four years and national reports from individual states.

=== Imperialism and colonialism ===
Colonialism has frequently involved an intentional destruction of cultural diversity, when the colonising powers use education, media, and violence to replace the languages, religions, and cultural values of the colonised people with their own. This process of forced assimilation has been used many times in history, particularly by the European colonial powers from the 18th to 20th centuries, taking the form of forced conversion to the coloniser's religion, privatisation of community property, and replacement of systems of work. The protection of indigenous peoples' rights to maintain their own languages, religions, and culture has been enshrined in treaties including the 1965 International Covenant on Civil and Political Rights and the 1989 UN Convention on the Rights of the Child.

=== Artistic freedom ===
Artistic freedom, as defined by the 2005 Convention, includes the freedom of artists to work without government interference, and also the freedom of citizens to access diverse cultural content. Governments can repress these freedoms through censorship or surveillance of artists, or can choose to actively protect artists and their free expression. According to the 2017 and 2022 global reports, attacks against artists — including prosecution, imprisonment, or even killing — have increased in recent years. In 2020, 978 cases were reported around the world, compared to 771 in 2019 and 673 in 2018. Musicians are the most threatened group, especially rap musicians, whose lyrics tend to be provocative and politically challenging. While online services have provided new ways for artists to distribute images, music, and video to large audiences, they have brought their own threats to freedom in the form of censorship, surveillance, and trolling. The 2022 global report found that some countries had repealed laws restricting free expression, including blasphemy and defamation laws, but that in practice artistic freedom was not being better monitored or protected.

=== Mobility of artists and cultural professionals ===
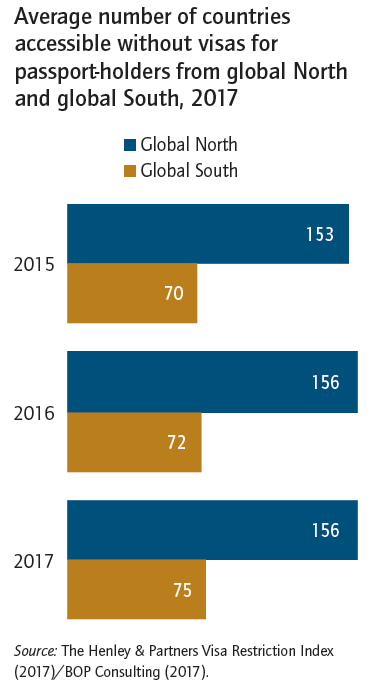
Average number of countries accessible without visas passport-holders Global North and Global South. 2017 (source: Henley Passport Index)

Mobility restrictions present challenges to professionals in the cultural and creative industries, specifically to those from the Global South. Artists and cultural professionals need to travel to perform to new audiences or to attend a residency or to engage in networking. Their ability to do so depends on their country of origin; the holder of a German passport can travel to 176 countries without a visa while for an Afghan passport the number of countries is 24. Travel restrictions, including difficulties in obtaining visas, often impede artists from the Global South to participate in art biennales or film festivals, even when invited to receive an award or to promote their works. The 2022 global report found that, despite governments and civil society organisations taking this inequality more seriously, concrete improvements are lacking. Thus, the ability of artists from the Global South to reach audiences in the Global North "remains extremely weak".

=== Governance of culture ===
As well as protecting free expression and free movement, governments can promote cultural diversity by recognising and enforcing the rights of artists. The working conditions of artists are affected by their rights to organise labor unions, to workplace safety, and to social security protections for times when their work does not produce income. These economic and social rights are formally recognised by the International Covenant on Economic, Social and Cultural Rights passed by the UN in 1966 and by the 1980 Recommendation concerning the Status of the Artist adopted by UNESCO in 1980. Social security in particular allows a more diverse range of citizens to take part in artistic activities, because without it, financially insecure people are discouraged from working in a field with unstable income.

=== Gender equality in cultural and creative industries ===
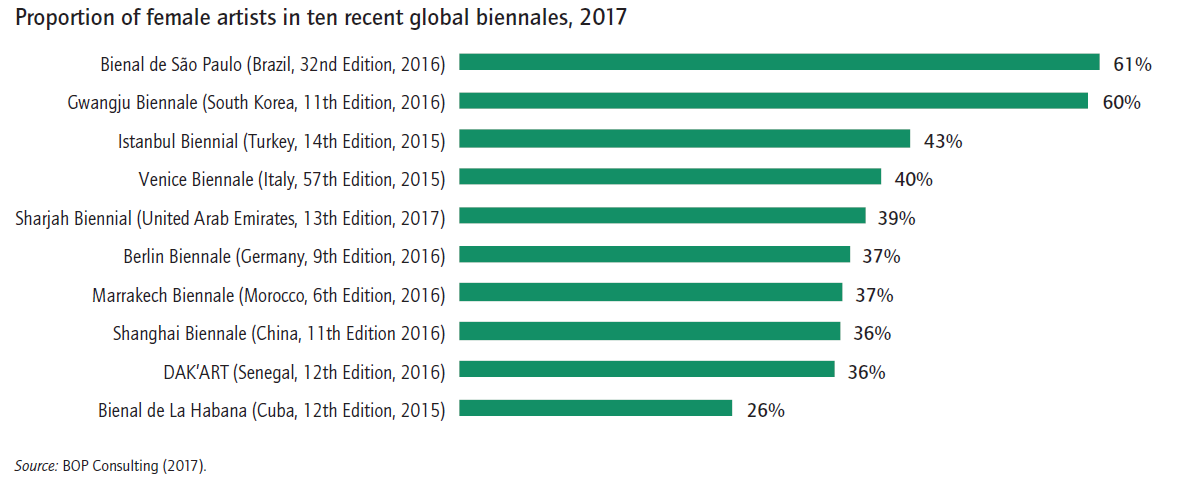
Proportion of female artists in ten recent global biennales, 2017 (source: BOP Consulting)

A gender gap persists worldwide concerning equal pay, access to funding and prices charged for creative works. Consequently, women remain under-represented in key creative roles and are outnumbered in decision-making positions. As of 2018, women made up only 34% of Ministers for Culture (compared to 24% in 2005) and only 31% of national arts program directors. Generally, women are better represented in specific cultural fields such as arts education and training (60%), book publishing and press (54%), audiovisual and interactive media (26%), as well as design and creative services (33%). The 2022 global report found that cultural industries were increasingly making gender equality a priority, but that actual progress was slow. Though 48.1% of the work in cultural and entertainment sectors is done by women, the report concluded that they are still under-represented in leadership positions, get less public funding, and get less recognition for their work.

=== Trade and investment in cultural goods and services ===
Between 2015 and 2017, at least eight bilateral and regional free trade agreements have introduced cultural clauses or list of commitments that promote the objectives and principles of the 2005 Convention. Despite the lack of the promotion of the objectives and principles of the 2005 Convention with regard to the negotiation of mega-regional partnership agreements, some parties to the Trans Pacific Partnership (TTP) have succeeded in introducing cultural reservations to protect and promote the diversity of cultural expressions. The growth of online digital content has increased the diversity of culture that a person can get immediate access to, but also increased the threat to cultural diversity by making it easier for a small number of large companies to flood markets with their cultural products. Digital delivery of culture has also given a great deal of power to companies in the technology sector.

=== Cultural platforms ===
Organisations that promote access to culture can reflect diversity in what they choose to host or to exclude. Google Arts and Culture and Europeana are among the platforms who state a commitment to promoting cultural diversity. For Google Arts and Culture, diversity implies "working with communities that have historically been left out of the mainstream cultural narrative" while Europeana acknowledges that "stories told with/by cultural heritage items have not historically been representative of the population, and so we strive to share lesser-told stories from underrepresented communities."

=== Individual choices ===
Individual citizens can experience and promote cultural diversity through their own choices, including the choice to share their own culture. The "Do One Thing for Diversity and Inclusion" campaign has been run annually since 2011 by the United Nations Alliance of Civilizations (UNAOC) as a way to commemorate the World Day for Cultural Diversity. It encourages people to explore the music, literature, art, and traditions of unfamiliar cultures and to share their own culture with strangers.

The American lawyer Juliette Passer describes the UNESCO Universal Declaration on Cultural Diversity as prompting each individual to consider their own and others' diverse identities:

"We need social and educational experiences plus reflection on the experience to go beyond reliance on stereotypes. The more we interact with diverse others and mindfully reflect on the experience, the more we can improve our competency with differences."

== National and local initiatives ==
In September 2002, the city of Porto Alegre in Brazil organized a world meeting for culture, bringing together mayors and technical directors of culture from different cities of the world, with observers from civil society. The cities of Porto Alegre and Barcelona have proposed the drafting of a reference document for the development of local cultural policies, inspired by Agenda 21, created in 1992 for the environment. The Culture 21 was thus designed with the aim of including cultural diversity at the local level. The document was approved on May 8, 2004 during the first edition of the Universal Forum of Cultures in Barcelona.

== See also ==
- Criticism of multiculturalism
- Cross-cultural communication
- Cultural agility
- Cultural Diversity Award (UNESCO)
- Cultural safety
- Foundation for Endangered Languages
- Heritage Day (South Africa)
- Intercultural dialogue
- Intercultural relations
- Melting pot
- Mondialogo
- Multiculturalism
- Social cohesion
- Social integration
- Subculture
