= John Kenneth Paranada =

British-Filipino curator

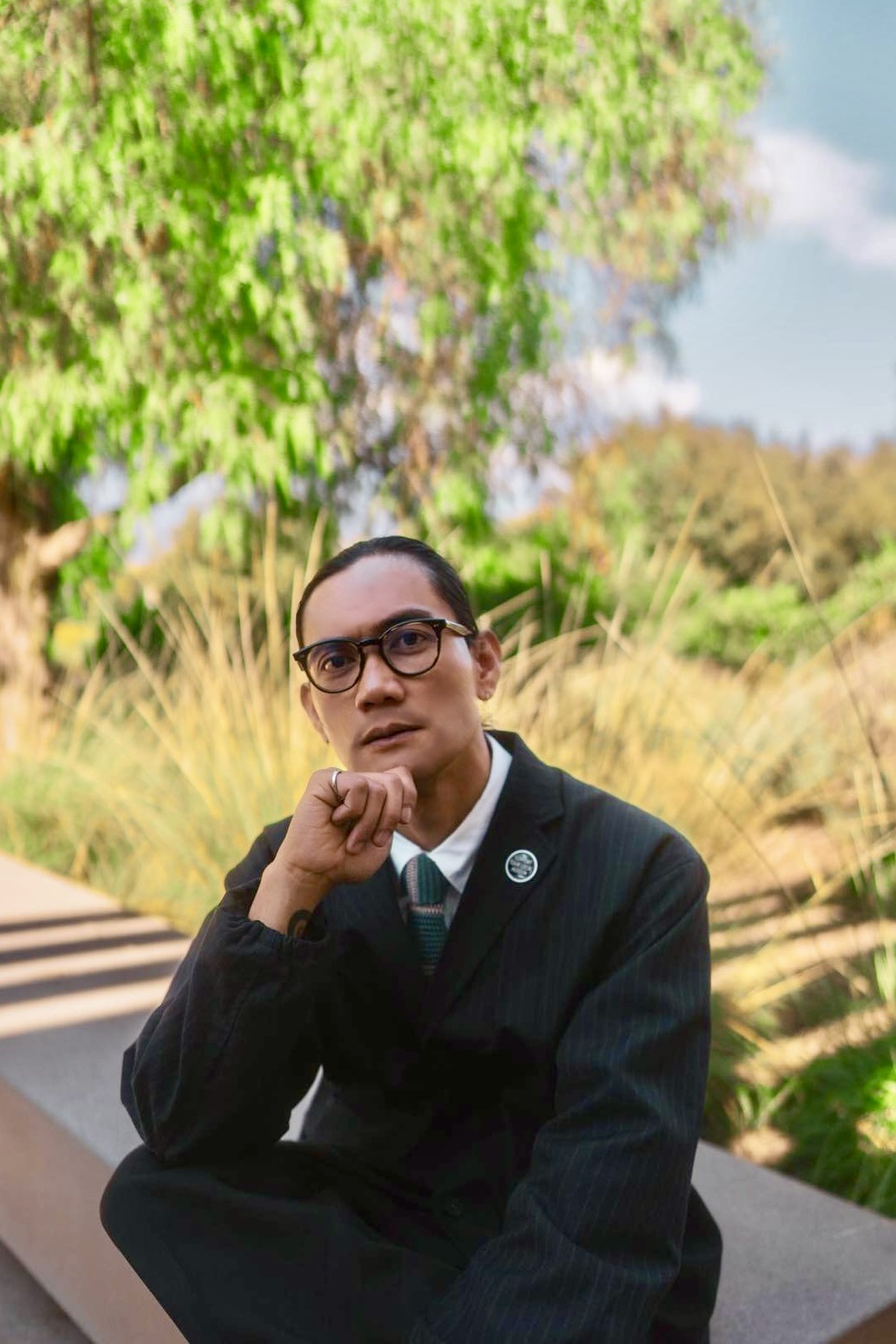
- John Kenneth Paranada at the Huntington Library, Art Museum and Botanical Gardens, California, 2024
- Born: September 22, 1988 (age 37); Rodriguez, Rizal, Philippines
- Occupations: Curator; critic; researcher; writer
- Known for: Curator of Art and Climate Change at the Sainsbury Centre for Visual Arts

John Kenneth Paranada (born 22 September 1988) is a British-Filipino curator, writer, researcher, and critic. He is the inaugural Curator of Art and Climate Change at the Sainsbury Centre for Visual Arts in Norwich, England, and a researcher at the Tyndall Centre for Climate Change Research at the University of East Anglia.

== Early life and education ==
Paranada was born 22 September 1988 in Rodriguez, Rizal, Philippines. In 2008, he earned a bachelor's degree in Philippine Studies from De La Salle University and in 2009, undertook a master's degree in Museum Studies at the University of the Philippines. From 2012 to 2013, he studied Philosophy of Nature at Sciences Po, Paris, and in 2015 completed degrees in curatorial studies at Zurich University of the Arts and Goldsmiths, University of London.

== Career ==
Paranada was first formally recognised in 2017 when he was shortlisted for the Purita Kalaw‑Ledesma Prizes for Art Criticism, an initiative of the Ateneo Art Gallery and the Kalaw‑Ledesma Foundation. In 2020, he contributed to the New Museum’s IdeasCity initiative and to the NTU Centre for Contemporary Art Singapore.

In January 2022, he was appointed Curator of Art and Climate Change at the Sainsbury Centre for Visual Arts, a position supported by the John Ellerman Foundation.

In March, he was named an EPIC Fellow by the Association of Art Museum Curators (AAMC), and that same year he served as a panellist for the AAMC’s “Environmental Ethics of Commissioning and Exhibition‑Making” session. He was also featured by the International Committee for Museums and Collections of Modern Art (CIMAM) in its climate‑focused curatorial publication. In addition, he co‑curated “The Collection of Jane Ryan & William Saunders” at the Cultural Center of the Philippines. In 2023, he curated the exhibition Sediment Spirit: The Activation of Art in the Anthropocene.

In April 2024, Paranada was a keynote speaker at the CIMAM Annual Conference in Los Angeles, and later that year he served on the jury for the inaugural Eric and Wendy Schmidt Environment and Art Prize at the Museum of Contemporary Art, Los Angeles (MOCA LA).

In May 2025, he curated A World of Water, an exhibition exploring oceanic change and collective efforts to address climate impacts. That same year, he was invited as a speaker to the AAMC Annual Conference.

Also, Paranada has presented at the Future Climates Symposium at Newcastle University and at the Sustainable ICT Summer School at Université Grenoble Alpes. He serves as a member of the Climate Change Working Group of the Association for Art History and has delivered talks at Norwich University of the Arts, the Great Northern Creative Fest, and EA Sustain.

== Selected publications ==
- 2022 “How Do We Begin a Meaningful Conversation About Art’s Place in the Climate Crisis,” Design for Our Planet
- 2023 Planet for Our Future: How Do We Adapt to a Transforming World?, Co-editor, Sainsbury Centre
- 2023 “A Path Forward: Curating Art & Climate Change at the Sainsbury Centre,” Museum International
- 2025 “Collisions: Art & Climate Change,” Adaptation: A Reconnected Earth
- 2025 Can the Seas Survive Us?, Co-editor, Kulturalis
