= Diversity Day =

Diversity Day can refer to:

- World Day for Cultural Diversity for Dialogue and Development
- Unity in Diversity Day at New Paltz (village), New York
- "Diversity Day" (The Office), a Season One episode of the sitcom The Office
