= World Day for Cultural Diversity for Dialogue and Development =

UN-sanctioned international holiday

World Day for Cultural Diversity
- Official name: World Day for Cultural Diversity for Dialogue and Development
- Observed by: All UN member states
- Type: United Nations International Declaration
- Celebrations: Multiple events worldwide
- Date: 21 May
- Next time: 21 May 2027
- Frequency: Annual
- First time: 2002; 24 years ago
- Related to: Cultural diversity

The World Day for Cultural Diversity for Dialogue and Development, sometimes abbreviated World Day for Cultural Diversity, is a United Nations sanctioned observance day for the promotion of diversity and intercultural dialogue. Begun in 2002, it is celebrated on 21 May. It was established by UNESCO in response to the 2001 Taliban terrorist attack that destroyed the Bamiyan Buddha statues in Afghanistan.

The 2002 Universal Declaration emphasized the role of culture in achieving prosperity, sustainable development, and fostering global peaceful coexistence.

== Background and origin ==
The Millennium Development Goals issued by the United Nations in 2000 did not mention culture as an aspect or facilitator of development. Since then, some UN agencies, especially the United Nations Educational, Scientific and Cultural Organization (UNESCO), have worked to encourage cultural diversity as an integral part of development. UNESCO's Universal Declaration on Cultural Diversity in November 2001 called for measures to protect the world's cultural diversity from the risk of globalisation. This document described cultural diversity as the "common heritage of humanity" and set out actions that member states could take to promote it. It was the first international instrument enshrining the value of cultural diversity and intercultural dialogue and led to further international efforts to promote diversity as a shared goal. One such effort was UN Resolution A/RES/57/249, proclaimed unanimously by the United Nations General Assembly on 20 December 2002, naming 21 May as the World Day for Cultural Diversity for Dialogue and Development.

Through the Universal Declaration on Cultural Diversity and other activities, UNESCO has promoted a new interpretation of culture. While cultural diversity was previously understood in terms of preserving established cultural material, the latest interpretation emphasises an ongoing process of interaction and dialogue. On the 2009 World Day for Cultural Diversity, UNESCO's Director-General Kōichirō Matsuura specified that the organisation "believes that cultures are not monolithic but interdependent, resulting from mutual exchanges and borrowings".

== Commemoration ==
The day is celebrated by events bringing together specialists from many areas of culture and representatives of government and non-government agencies. Since 2011, the United Nations Alliance of Civilizations (UNAOC) has run the "Do One Thing for Diversity and Inclusion" campaign, in partnership with UNESCO and other public and private organisations. This asks people to spend World Day for Cultural Diversity learning about different cultures or sharing their own culture with others.

On 21 May 2018, amidst other celebrations of the day in Germany, the German Commission for UNESCO and the Bertelsmann Foundation used the day to promote a report arguing that a diverse cultural sector promotes harmonious living in a diverse society. It recommended that cultural institutions and public bodies extend their support for art from diverse cultures and remove barriers to participation for immigrant artists and performers.

The observance day is regularly celebrated in Botswana with national and tribal ceremonies and artistic events. This has helped to raise awareness of the Batlokwa minority ethnic culture and enabled observers to document and preserve this culture by recording events. The organisation Pink Armenia commemorated the day in 2012 with a diversity parade showing posters of Armenia's ethnic minorities. In 2022 events took place in Cameroon's national museum and at Mankono in the Ivory Coast. In 2023, the city of Glasgow in Scotland hosted an event curated by Nigerian author Funmi Obisesan to celebrate the variety of diasporas in Scotland. The British House of Lords held an event celebrating Indian languages. Cyprus celebrated the day with a festival held in Nicosia. In Zimbabwe, celebrations of the day were extended to a Culture Week, and then in 2022 to a Culture Month, including celebrations of present and historical culture at local and national levels.

UNESCO hosted an international conference on public art in 2011 leading up to the observance day, while celebrations also took place at the UNESCO regional office in Cuba. To commemorate the day in 2022, UNESCO headquarters hosted an event bringing together representatives of 38 signatories of the 2005 Convention on the Protection and Promotion of the Diversity of Cultural Expressions with a keynote speech by Sir David Khalili, a UNESCO Goodwill Ambassador. Khalili's charity, the Khalili Foundation, runs, in partnership with UNESCO, a World Festival of Cultural Diversity culminating in the World Day for Cultural Diversity.
