= Mondialogo =

Initiative to promote intercultural dialogue among youth

Mondialogo is an initiative launched by Daimler AG and UNESCO that seeks to promote intercultural dialogue and exchange among young people. The global initiative is based on three pillars: the Mondialogo School Contest, the Mondialogo Engineering Award and the Mondialogo Internet Portal, which serves as a platform for dialogue and communication.

== The initiative ==
Mondialogo was initiated by Daimler AG and UNESCO in October 2003. The global initiative aims to bring together young people with different cultural backgrounds from all over the world to promote mutual understanding and inspire in them a long-term enthusiasm for intercultural exchange. Mondialogo is primarily addressing pupils, students and teachers worldwide. The writers Henning Mankell and Paulo Coelho are ambassadors for Mondialogo.

== Pillars of the Initiative ==
=== Mondialogo School Contest ===
The Mondialogo School Contest is the world's largest international contest for pupils between the ages of 14 and 18. All registered school teams are given a partner team previously unknown to them from a different region of the world. The teams establish contact, get to know each other and then develop a mutual project that should deal with topics such as peace, fair play, preventing discrimination, a sustainable future, identity, respectfulness toward cultural diversity or emigration/immigration.

At the end of a 6-month work phase the results of the teams are judged by an international jury. The top 25 entries are chosen and the teams get invited to a symposium lasting several days. This is an opportunity for pupils and teachers from all over the world to meet and get to know each other in person.

Two rounds of the Mondialogo School Contest have already been completed: 25,000 pupils from 126 countries took part in the 2003/2004 contest. The awards were given out in 2004 in Barcelona. The second contest saw the participation of 35,000 pupils (in 2,600 teams) from 138 countries. The symposium took place in Rome in 2006. The third round is finished and the symposium took place in Beijing in 2008.

=== Mondialogo Engineering Award ===
The Mondialogo Engineering Award calls for engineering students from developed and developing countries to form international project team and enter project proposals addressing the United Nations Millennium Development Goals – proposals that are capable of advancing the quality of life in the developing countries.

The first two rounds had 3,600 young engineers from 113 countries in 1,500 project teams participating in the Mondialogo Engineering Award. After a six-month project work phase the teams entered project proposals that are judged by an international jury of experts. The top 30 entrees are awarded prizes given out during a symposium lasting several days. The symposia took place in Berlin and Mumbai, respectively. The awards are endowed with a prize money of altogether €300,000, intended to help get the project proposals realised.

=== Mondialogo Internet Portal ===
The Mondialogo Internet Portal is the initiative's communications and information platform. In five languages, it offers a global online-community of over 26,000 members from 174 countries many features that allow them to communicate, interact, and network.

Teams participating in the Mondialogo School Contest and the Mondialogo Engineering Award here have virtual project offices that allow them to jointly work on their projects.

Details about the contests, news surrounding intercultural dialogue, and the Mondialogo Magazine are also provided on the portal, as well as all the latest about current developments and former projects, which can be found in the Inside Mondialogo Blog, written by members of the team and former participants.

== Awards ==
Since being founded in 2003, Mondialogo has been awarded several prizes for furthering intercultural dialogue. Among those are:

- Clarion Award 2005 by the International Visual Communication Association (IVCA), London
- Preis für Freiheit und Verantwortung 2005 (Freedom and Respondibility Award 2005, Germany)
- PR News CSR Awards 2006
- Best Global Website Award 2005
- WebAward 2006 (Outstanding Community Website)
- International Business Award 2007 (Best CSR Program in Europe)
