= Museum International =

- Discipline: Museology
- Language: English, French
- Edited by: Isabelle Vinson

Publication details
- History: 1948-present
- Publisher: Wiley-Blackwell
- Frequency: Quarterly

Standard abbreviations
- ISO 4: Mus. Int.

Indexing
- English edition
- ISSN: 1350-0775 (print); 1468-0033 (web)
- OCLC no.: 40349198
- French edition
- ISSN: 1020-2226 (print); 1755-5825 (web)

Links
- Journal homepage; English-language edition; French-language edition

Museum International is a peer-reviewed academic journal that covers research on the ethics and practices of museums and heritage organizations. It is published quarterly by Wiley-Blackwell and ICOM.
