= Convention for the Safeguarding of the Intangible Cultural Heritage =

UNESCO treaty

- Logo
- Signed: 17 October 2003
- Location: Paris
- Effective: 20 April 2006
- Condition: 30 ratifications
- Ratifiers: 185
- Depositary: Director-General of UNESCO
- Languages: Arabic, Chinese, English, French, Russian and Spanish

States parties to the convention (in orange)

The Convention for the Safeguarding of the Intangible Cultural Heritage is a UNESCO treaty adopted by the UNESCO General Conference on 17 October 2003.

The convention entered into force in 2006, after thirty instruments of ratification by UNESCO Member States. Romania was the 30th state, ratifying the agreement on 20 January 2006. As of October 2022, 180 states have ratified, approved or accepted the convention.

== Content ==
=== Layout ===
The convention contains the following provisions:

1. General Provisions
2. Organs of the Convention
3. Safeguarding of the intangible cultural heritage at the national level
4. Safeguarding of the intangible cultural heritage at the international level
5. International cooperation and assistance
6. Intangible Cultural Heritage Fund
7. Reports
8. Transitional clause
9. Final clauses

=== Purposes ===
Unlike other UNESCO conventions, this convention begins with stating its purposes, which are;

1. to safeguard the intangible cultural heritage;
2. to ensure respect for the intangible cultural heritage of the communities, groups and individuals concerned;
3. to raise awareness at the local, national and international levels of the importance of the intangible cultural heritage, and of ensuring mutual appreciation thereof;
4. to provide for international cooperation and assistance.

=== Definition ===
Intangible cultural heritage refers to "traditions or living expressions inherited from our ancestors and passed on to our descendants, such as oral traditions, performing arts, social practices, rituals, festive events, knowledge and practices concerning nature and the universe or the knowledge and skills to produce traditional crafts". The convention defines it as follows:

Intangible Cultural Heritage means the practices, representations, expressions, knowledge, and skills – as well as the instruments, objects, artifacts and cultural spaces associated therewith – that communities, groups and, in some cases, individuals recognize as part of their cultural heritage. This intangible cultural heritage, transmitted from generation to generation, is constantly recreated by communities and groups in response to their environment, their interaction with nature and their history, and provides them with a sense of identity and continuity, thus promoting respect for cultural diversity and human creativity. For the purposes of this Convention, consideration will be given solely to such intangible cultural heritage as is compatible with existing international human rights instruments, as well as with the requirements of mutual respect among communities, groups and individuals, and of sustainable development.

=== Function ===
The convention works on both national and international levels. At the national level, state parties are supposed to "take necessary measures to ensure the safeguarding of the intangible cultural heritage present in its territory". These measures include identification of the intangible cultural heritage that exists in its territory, adoption of appropriate policies, promotion of education and so on. Besides, in taking these measures, each state parties must "endeavor to ensure the widest possible participation of communities, groups, and, where appropriate, individuals that create, maintain and transmit such heritage, and to involve them actively in its management".

At the international level, this convention promotes cooperation, which includes "the exchange of information and experience, joint initiatives, and the establishment of a mechanism of assistance" to other state parties.

==== Lists ====
The Committee to the Convention publishes and keeps up to date two lists of intangible cultural heritage: the Representative List of the Intangible Cultural Heritage of Humanity and the List of Intangible Cultural Heritage in Need of Urgent Safeguarding.

==== Intangible Cultural Heritage Fund ====
The convention establishes the Intangible Cultural Heritage Fund, the use of which is decided by the committee. The fund mainly consists of the contributions by state parties and funds by the General Conference of UNESCO.

== History ==
=== Precursors ===
One of the first international occasions that mentioned the preservation of 'intangible heritage' was the World Conference on Cultural Policies in Mexico City in 1982. This Conference defined cultural heritage as including "both tangible and intangible works through which the creativity of people finds expression", and asked UNESCO and member states to take measures for protecting this kind of heritage.

In 1989, UNESCO adopted the Recommendation on the Safeguarding of Traditional Culture and Folklore as the first legal instrument towards the safeguarding of intangible cultural heritage. This recommendation reflected the ideas of the earlier conference in Mexico City. UNESCO conducted some promotional programs for raising awareness of this recommendation, but was not very successful. However, in the late 1990s, there was a conference held for the assessment of this recommendation, which pointed out some problems to be considered in drafting the convention.

In 1997, UNESCO launched the program of Proclamation of the Masterpieces of the Oral and Intangible Heritage of Humanity, intending to raise awareness of the importance of intangible heritage. This program proclaimed a total of 90 masterpieces between 2001 and 2005, and caused the movement toward the convention.

=== Creation ===
A preliminary study was undertaken to establish how intangible cultural heritage could be safeguarded.In 2001, the General Conference adopted the Universal Declaration on Cultural Diversity, which also includes articles dealing with the preservation of "heritage in all forms". This declaration and its action plan provided the basis for the convention.

After two years of meetings, the draft convention was brought to the General Conference and adopted in 2003.

=== Recent members ===
On November 6, 2020, Somalia and Angola were 179th and 180th nations that joined the 2003 Convention for the Safeguarding of the Intangible Cultural Heritage.

== Reception ==
The definition of intangible cultural heritage has been criticized as potentially incomplete and/or creating a "Pandora's box of difficulties". For example, in a 2004 article in Museum International, Richard Kurin says that because the convention does not recognize cultural activities not compatible with international human rights instruments, some activities, such as female genital mutilation, that groups may themselves consider critical to their culture, are not eligible. Similarly, Kurin notes that since many groups' culture is defined in opposition to other cultures, the requirement for "mutual respect" may leave out traditional songs and stories that glorify "empire, victorious kings, religious conversion, or alternatively resistance to perceived injustice, martyrdom and defeat". However, Kurin also notes that the definition can be more expansive than intended by its designers, who originally planned only to protect "traditional cultural activities". He says that it is robust enough to encompass more modern forms of culture, including things like "rap music, Australian cricket, modern dance, post-modernist architectural knowledge, and karaoke bars".

Richard Kurin has argued that dividing culture into individual units is inconsistent with modern academic views of cultures. Additionally, Michael Brown has argued that convention's focus on cataloging is based on an outdated idea that listing the details of a culture has some connection to preservation of that culture. States are also encouraged to enact programs to safeguard intangible cultural heritages, though any such work must be done in cooperation with the local practitioners. This aspect has also been criticized, since it is unclear how a state can safeguard a cultural practice by force, particularly if there is insufficient interest from local practitioners.

== See also ==
- UNESCO Intangible Cultural Heritage Lists
