= Convention on the Protection and Promotion of the Diversity of Cultural Expressions =

2005 UNESCO-related treaty

2005 Convention
Convention on the Protection and Promotion of the Diversity of Cultural Expressions
- Countries that have ratified the convention
- Signed: 20 October 2005; 20 years ago
- Location: Paris, France
- Effective: March 2007
- Condition: Ratification by 30 states
- Parties: 153
- Depositary: United Nations/UNESCO
- Language: Authoritative in Arabic, Chinese, English, French, Russian, and Spanish

The Convention on the Protection and Promotion of the Diversity of Cultural Expressions is an international treaty adopted in October 2005 in Paris during the 33rd session of the General Conference of the United Nations Educational, Scientific and Cultural Organization (UNESCO). In response to the fears that globalization would lead to an increasingly uniform global culture, it allows states to protect cultural diversity and cultural expressions by promoting and defending their own cultural industries. It also establishes international co-operation to help protect the cultural industries of developing countries, including the creation of the International Fund for Cultural Diversity. It reaffirms many of the principles of the 2001 UNESCO Universal Declaration on Cultural Diversity but, unlike that declaration, it is legally binding and requires legal ratification by member states. The convention is the first international treaty to give cultural goods a special status, having cultural as well as economic value.

The convention addresses many audiences and operates at three main levels. First, it is an international treaty governing co-operation between states. Second, it guides national and international governments in the legislation and other actions they can take to preserve cultural diversity within their states or regions. Third, it calls for action by public and civil bodies at local and national levels to support diverse cultural expressions. The convention has no enforcing body; it leaves enforcement to the member states but sets out procedures in case of disputes between them.

One hundred and forty-eight countries voted to approve the treaty, with five abstaining and the United States and Israel opposing. The agreement came into effect in March 2007 and has been ratified by 151 states, as well as by the European Union.

== Background and negotiations ==
The convention was a response to treaties and other international measures promoting trade liberalization in cultural goods, especially the actions of the World Trade Organisation (WTO). These were seen as undermining the sovereign right of states to use cultural policies to support their own cultural industries. The convention aimed to provide a legally binding international agreement that reaffirms that right. It enshrined the view that goods and services created as cultural expressions have both an economic and cultural nature and so cannot be seen purely as economic goods. The convention also defines cultural industry and interculturality and calls for international co-operation, especially to support the cultural industries of developing countries.

=== The impact of trade liberalization on cultural policy ===
The concept of diversity of cultural expressions is the result of a paradigm shift in the way that culture is considered in international relations, particularly in the context of agreements aimed at liberalizing trade. It succeeds the concepts of cultural exception or cultural exemption that appeared during the 1980s. The awareness on the part of certain states of the impacts of the liberalization of economic exchanges on their cultural policies is the trigger for the emergence of the concept of cultural diversity and the need to protect the diversity of cultural expressions, particularly because of the strength of the Hollywood film market.

The convention was born out of a desire to reconcile cultural diversity with increasingly liberal trade agreements. The international community was progressively lowering barriers to free trade, easing the movement of goods, services and capital between states. In several free trade agreements, states were able to establish exceptions to their commitments, either to protect specific sectors or to protect their policies such as environmental, social or culture.

The 1947 the General Agreement on Tariffs and Trade already recognized the cultural specificity of the film sector by allowing states to maintain certain types of screen quotas to ensure the broadcasting of national films. When the trade system was being reformed in the 1980s and 1990s, Canada and France asked that special treatment be given to audiovisual services in the new General Agreement on Trade in Services (GATS) then under negotiation. The United States firmly opposed this, which led to the "failure of the cultural exception", an expression that reflects the impossibility of excluding the cultural sector from the reformed multilateral trade system.

The vulnerability of state cultural policies is also apparent in some trade disputes, most notably in Canada - Certain Measures Concerning Periodicals. In that case, the panel rejected one of Canada's arguments that, because the content of Canadian and U.S. periodicals differ, the products are not similar and, therefore, may be treated differently by Canada. In the end, certain measures to protect the Canadian periodical industry were not adopted.

One topic of negotiation is whether products with cultural value be treated like any other commodity. Some states answer in the affirmative, arguing that it is necessary to adopt a legal instrument that is independent of the WTO's multilateral trade system in order to recognize the dual nature, economic and cultural, of cultural goods and services. The recognition of this dual nature is reflected in certain bilateral or regional trade agreements that include cultural exemption clauses. The first agreement to contain a cultural exemption clause was the Canada-US Free Trade Agreement of 1988.

The application of trade rules to cultural products raises a particular problem. By making commitments in economic agreements, states agree to eliminate all forms of discrimination between domestic and imported cultural products. In doing so, they are gradually relinquishing their cultural sovereignty, that is, their ability to develop cultural policies and provide support for their own cultural industries, which reflect their identity. In this sense, the very foundations of free trade make it difficult to recognize the specific nature of cultural products, which are bearers of identity, value and meaning, hence the need to incorporate cultural exception and cultural exemption clauses (cultural clauses) into economic agreements.

Although these clauses are multiplying, concern remains in cultural circles about the progressive liberalization of the cultural sector and the repeated characterization of cultural products as mere "merchandise". In fact, cultural clauses receive a mixed reception during trade negotiations. Some states consider them to be protectionist and therefore antithetical to the ideology of free trade, which favours open markets. The United States generally refuses to incorporate such clauses into the free trade agreements it negotiates.

The concept of cultural diversity allows for a more positive perspective and a more positive approach to free trade. It allows for a balance to be struck between the economic benefits of opening up economies and taking into account the specificity of cultural products.

=== The role of UNESCO ===
The Convention on the Protection and Promotion of the Diversity of Cultural Expressions is one of seven UNESCO conventions that deal with the four core areas of creative diversity; cultural and natural heritage, movable cultural property, intangible cultural heritage and contemporary creativity. The others are the Universal Copyright Convention (1952, followed by a revision in 1971), the Hague Convention for the Protection of Cultural Property in the Event of Armed Conflict (1954/1999), the Convention on the Means of Prohibiting and Preventing the Illicit Import, Export and Transfer of Ownership of Cultural Property (1970), the Convention Concerning the Protection of World Cultural and Natural Heritage (1972), the Convention on the Protection of the Underwater Cultural Heritage (2001), and the Convention for the Safeguarding of the Intangible Cultural Heritage (2003).

Faced with the fact that the commitments made within the WTO did not allow for the recognition of the dual nature of cultural goods and services, some states decided at the end of the 1990s to move the debate to UNESCO. On the one hand, UNESCO's constitution, and particularly Articles 1 and 2, make it the appropriate international forum for this debate. On the other hand, the United States was not a member of this organization at the time (it rejoined UNESCO in 2003 when the negotiation of the convention was launched), which created a favourable context for the development of a multilateral instrument aimed at protecting cultural diversity.

In 1998, the Action Plan on Cultural Policies for Development drawn up at the Stockholm Conference recommended that cultural goods and services should be treated differently from other merchandise. This action plan sets the stage for developments in cultural diversity from the early 2000s onwards.

=== UNESCO Universal Declaration on Cultural Diversity ===
The UNESCO Universal Declaration on Cultural Diversity was adopted unanimously by 188 member states on 2 November 2001, in the aftermath of the September 11 attacks. It affirms "that respect for the diversity of cultures, tolerance, dialogue and cooperation, in a climate of mutual trust and understanding, are among the best guarantees of international peace and security". It represents an opportunity to "categorically reject the thesis of inescapable conflicts of cultures and civilizations".

In Article 8 of the declaration, UNESCO members affirm that "cultural goods and services [...], because they convey identity, values and meaning, should not be treated as commodities or consumer goods like any other." In Article 9, the role of cultural policies is defined as a tool to "create conditions conducive to the production and dissemination of diversified cultural goods and services".

This declaration is not legally binding. The desirability of negotiating a binding international legal instrument is set out in Annex II of the declaration. Several articles of the declaration are included in the Convention on the Protection and Promotion of the Diversity of Cultural Expressions.

=== Negotiations ===
Work towards the convention began in the fall of 2003, with a decision of the UNESCO General Conference. Fifteen independent experts participated in a series of three meetings to create a preliminary draft. This draft was distributed to member states in July 2004. It formed the basis for the intergovernmental negotiations from the fall of 2004 onwards to prepare the draft convention to be presented to the General Conference in 2005.

The first intergovernmental meeting, held from 20 to 24 September 2004, set up the negotiating structure and expressed the respective views on the type of convention to come. Differences of opinion persisted regarding the purpose of the convention, its relationship with other international agreements and the level of commitment required. At the second intergovernmental meeting, the Plenary Assembly considered almost all of the provisions of the preliminary draft. Definitions of key terms were discussed, as was the dispute settlement mechanism.

One of the significant difficulties encountered in the negotiations was the question of whether the convention would prevail over, or be subordinate to, other existing or future international agreements negotiated by the parties. Initially, the positions of the states were polarized on whether there would be an explicit clause setting out the relations between the convention and other international commitments. Some states, including the United States, Japan, New Zealand, Tunisia and India, questioned the need for such a clause. A majority of states, on the other hand, wanted the convention placed on an equal footing with other instruments. They argued that the dual nature of cultural goods and services mean that they should be treated by both the WTO and UNESCO texts. The need to incorporate such a clause was finally agreed upon. It would confirm complementarity and non-hierarchy between the convention and other international legal instruments. This would become Article 20 of the convention.

At the third intergovernmental meeting, a working group was charged with finding a compromise between the positions expressed to date on the relationship of the convention to other treaties. A stormy vote on the text of Article 20 led the United States to request registration of its formal opposition to the adopted text. Between the end of the negotiations and the 33rd General Conference of UNESCO, the United States led a campaign to reopen the negotiations. Canada responded by proposing that the preliminary draft be considered a draft convention to be voted on for adoption at the 33rd session of the General Conference, which it was. In advance of the General Conference, Condoleezza Rice, the United States Secretary of State, wrote to attendees, asking them not to sign the convention, which she said "invites abuse by forces opposed to freedom of expression and free trade".

== Purpose ==
The main objective for the convention is to protect and promote the diversity of cultural expressions. The convention highlights the fact that cultural creativity has been placed upon all of humanity and that aside from economical gains, creative diversity reaps plenty of cultural and social advantages. States must also promote "openness to other cultures of the world". Protective measures are also included in the convention and international co-operation is encouraged in times of need.

Additional objectives are as follows:

- To reaffirm the sovereign rights of states to adopt cultural policies while ensuring the free movement of ideas and works.
- To recognise the distinct nature of cultural goods and services as vehicles of values, identity and meaning.
- To define a new framework for international cultural co-operation, the keystone of the convention.
- To create the conditions for cultures to flourish and freely interact in a mutually beneficial manner.
- To endeavour to support co-operation for sustainable development and poverty reduction, via assistance from the International Fund for Cultural Diversity.
- To ensure that civil society plays a major role in the implementation of the convention.
- To "strengthen international cooperation and solidarity with a view to favouring the cultural expressions of all countries, in particular those whose cultural goods and services suffer from lack of access to the means of creation, production and dissemination at the national and international level."

The convention also affirms that "Cultural diversity can be protected and promoted only if human rights and fundamental freedoms, such as freedom of expression, information and communication, as well as the ability of individuals to choose cultural expressions, are guaranteed" in a manner against a cultural relativism that may undermine universality of human rights.

The intended beneficiaries to the convention include all individuals and societies. The convention lists several groups such as women, indigenous peoples, minorities, and artists and practitioners of developing nations as specifically intended to benefit.

== Content ==
=== Preamble ===
The preamble affirms the importance and benefits of cultural diversity and of the "framework of democracy, tolerance, social justice and mutual respect" needed for it to flourish. It refers to many issues on the periphery of the scope of the convention, yet intimately linked to the diversity of cultural expressions, including intellectual property rights, the protection of fundamental rights and freedoms, linguistic diversity, and traditional knowledge.

=== Section I: Objectives and guiding principles ===
Article 1 of the convention sets out the convention's nine purposes discussed above. Article 2 lists eight principles that guide the interpretation of commitments made by the parties:

- Principle of respect for human rights and fundamental freedoms
- Principle of sovereignty
- Principle of equal dignity and respect for all cultures
- Principle of international solidarity and cooperation
- Principle of the complementarity of economic and cultural aspects of development
- Principle of sustainable development
- Principle of equitable access
- Principle of openness and balance

=== Section II: Scope of application ===
Article 3 sets out the scope of application: "This Convention shall apply to the policies and measures adopted by the Parties relating to the protection and promotion of the diversity of cultural expressions."

=== Section III: Definitions ===
The convention defines the following terms to explain their specific legal meaning: "cultural diversity", "cultural content", "cultural expressions", "cultural activities, goods and services", "cultural industries", "cultural policies and measures", "protection" and "interculturality". The convention creates several new concepts and uses similar expressions to some already known. As interpreted in the convention, cultural activities, goods, or services must result from creativity and have cultural content: symbolic meaning, artistic dimension or values related to cultural identity. "Cultural diversity" is interpreted both in terms of cultural heritage that is preserved, and in terms of diverse ways of creating, sharing, and enjoying art. This definition creates the link with the Universal Declaration on Cultural Diversity.

=== Section IV: Rights and obligations of the parties ===
The section on rights and obligations is central to the convention. It focuses on rights, especially the rights of states to take action to protect their cultural diversity. Most of these rights are expressed as options ("Parties may...") rather than requirements ("Parties shall..."). In article 5, the convention reaffirms the sovereign right of states to use legislation to promote and protect the diversity of cultural expressions. Article 6 goes into more detail, listing examples of what states may do. It suggests regulation; the use of quotas on cultural content; subsidies and other support for cultural institutions or for individual artists; and giving domestic cultural industries ways to produce, promote, and publicise their output.

The obligation to promote cultural expressions is set out in article 7. Parties to the convention have an obligation to promote cultural expressions within their territory, giving individuals and society access to a diverse set of cultural influences from their own country and from around the world.

Article 8 sets out the powers of a state to identify a situation where a cultural expression is in need of "urgent safeguarding" and to take "all appropriate measures". It requires the parties to notify the Intergovernmental Committee (created by article 23) of any such measure. The committee may then make appropriate recommendations.

Articles 9 to 11 commit the states to sharing information transparently, to promoting cultural diversity through education and public awareness programs, and to working with civil society to achieve the convention's goals.

Article 12 sets out the five objectives of states in relation to international cooperation. Article 13 sets out the obligation of the parties to integrate culture into their sustainable development policies at all levels. This echoes article 11 of the UNESCO Universal Declaration on Cultural Diversity, which describes cultural diversity as "a guarantee of sustainable human development". Article 14 provides a list of suggested forms of international cultural cooperation. These relate to the strengthening of cultural industries, capacity building, transfer of technology and know-how, and financial support.

Article 15 is the most explicit provision for partnerships between public authorities and civil society, especially to respond to the needs of developing countries.

Article 16 contains one of the most binding commitments of the convention. It states that "[d]eveloped countries shall facilitate cultural exchanges with developing countries by granting, through appropriate institutional and legal frameworks, preferential treatment to their artists and other cultural professionals and practitioners, as well as to their cultural goods and services." The obligation to "facilitate cultural exchanges" rests with developed countries and must benefit developing countries. This is the first time that a binding agreement in the cultural field has explicitly referred to "preferential treatment". Preferential treatment measures can be cultural in nature (e.g., hosting artists from developing countries in artists' residencies in developed countries), commercial in nature (e.g., easing the demands of artists in developed countries), or commercial in nature (e.g., facilitating the movement of cultural goods and services) or mixed, i.e., both cultural and commercial (e.g., entering into a film co-production agreement that includes measures that facilitate access to the developed country market for the co-produced work).

Article 17 commits parties to cooperate in situations of serious threat to cultural expressions of the kind mentioned in article 8.

The International Fund for Cultural Diversity (IFCD) was created as a result of the demands of developing countries and is established under article 18 of the convention. It is funded by voluntary contributions from member states. This creates some uncertainty as to the sustainability of the funding and ensures that the establishment of the fund is based on the principle of "hierarchical solidarity" rather than "reciprocity". Developing countries that are parties to the convention can apply to the IFCD for funding for specific activities that develop their cultural policies and cultural industries. As of April 2023, UNESCO reports that 140 projects in 69 developing countries have been carried out with funding from the IFCD.

In article 19, the parties commit to sharing data, expertise, and best practice for the protection and promotion of culture, creating a data bank maintained by UNESCO.

=== Section V: Relationship with other instruments ===
Article 20 explains that the convention is to be interpreted as complementary to other existing treaties, not overruling or modifying them. In article 21, the parties "undertake to promote the objectives and principles of this Convention in other international forums." The term "other international forums" refers in particular to the World Trade Organization (WTO), the World Intellectual Property Organization (WIPO), the Organisation for Economic Co-operation and Development (OECD), but also to more informal bilateral or regional fora or negotiating groups.

=== Section VI: Organs of the convention ===
Article 22 establishes the Conference of the Parties, the governing body of the convention. This is composed of all the countries that have ratified the convention and meets every two years. Article 23 creates an Intergovernmental Committee for the Protection and Promotion of the Diversity of Cultural Expressions. This is composed of 24 parties elected by the Conference of the Parties from all regions of the world. Members are given a four-year term and meet annually. These two bodies together act as a "political forum on the future of cultural policy and international cooperation". Article 24 requires the UNESCO Secretariat to assist both of them.

== Ratification and implementation ==
=== Ratification and non-ratification ===
To date, 151 signatory states, as well as the European Union, have registered their ratification of the convention, or a legally equivalent process. Canada was the first party to ratify the treaty on 28 November 2005. Many more ratifications took place until 2007, after which the rate slowed down. The most recent ratifications are from Cape Verde (26 May 2021) and Pakistan (4 March 2022).

A November 2007 meeting of delegates from 59 member states of the Commonwealth produced the Kampala Civil Society Statement, which made recommendations to the Commonwealth Heads of Government Meeting. One recommendation was that Commonwealth states should ratify the convention and work with civil society to implement it.

Some Arab states, states in the Asia-Pacific region, Russia and Japan have not ratified or implemented the convention. The United States refused to ratify despite actively participating in the negotiations and drafting. The main argument of their opposition is that cultural products are commodities in the same way as other goods and services. They argue that the benefits of free trade extend to cultural goods and services. The United States left UNESCO at the end of 2018 but officially rejoined in July 2023.

=== Implementation monitoring ===
The monitoring framework is structured by four overarching objectives from the convention, as well as by the desired outcomes, core indicators and means of verification. The four objectives are: (1) supporting sustainable cultural governance systems, (2) achieving a balanced exchange of cultural goods and services and increasing the mobility of artists and cultural professionals, (3) including culture in sustainable development frameworks and (4) promoting human rights and fundamental freedoms.

The monitoring framework is based on Article 9 of the convention. It is specified by the Operational Guidelines for information sharing and transparency. In order to respect this commitment, the parties designate a point of contact and must produce periodic reports every four years, starting from the date of deposit of its instrument of ratification, acceptance, approval or accession. These reports are examined by the Conference of the Parties in order to plan international cooperation by identifying innovative measures and targeting the needs of countries that could benefit. As of 2021, it was reported that just half the ratifying states have complied with their reporting duties; there are no penalties for failing to comply.

The UNESCO Institute for Statistics (UIS) has worked to support the convention by creating a Framework for Cultural Statistics and establishing an Expert Group on Measuring the Diversity of Cultural Expressions.

=== Effect on subsequent international agreements ===
UNESCO reports that "at least eight bilateral and regional free trade agreements concluded between 2015 and 2017 have introduced cultural clauses or list [sic] of commitments that promote the objectives and principles of the 2005 Convention."

=== Implementation in the online environment ===
The convention was negotiated at a time when music and films were mainly sold on CD and DVD formats. The subsequent years saw the rise of online streaming media, meaning that cultural works could be exported from one country to another without a physical medium. This increased the risk that cultural diversity would be threatened as more people had immediate access to the cultural productions of particular countries. The convention was intended to be technologically neutral so that future advancements would not leave it outdated. The definitions in section III allow states to develop cultural policies for digital cultural products. However, this rapid technological change raised the question of how to interpret the convention's rights and obligations relating to online cultural works. The community responded in 2017 by creating and adopting the Operational Guidelines on the Implementation of the Convention in the Digital Environment.

=== The role of civil society ===
The convention repeatedly mentions civil society — including non-governmental organizations (NGOs), cultural professionals and cultural groups — as necessary for implementation of its desired changes. Civil society organizations are involved at several levels in the implementation and promotion of the convention. (Note: For example, Coalitions for the Diversity of Cultural Expressions are active around the world: Canada, Australia, Belgium, Benin, Chad, Chile, France, Gabon, Germany, Mali, Nigeria, Paraguay, Portugal, Slovakia, Switzerland, Togo and Turkey. There is also the International Network of Jurists for the Diversity of Cultural Expressions, the World Organization of the Francophonie.) Although they cannot attend the Conferences of the Parties, they can attend, by invitation, the meetings of the Intergovernmental Committee; participate in funding; contribute their expertise; or receive grants from the International Fund for Cultural Diversity.

A 2015 study found that many activities arising from the convention involved civil society, or partnerships between civil society and government, although fewer than half of the national reports mentioned involving civil society. It also found that the NGOs most involved in these activities were usually already well-established and used to working with government, which tend to be organizations in the Global North. The authors conclude that there are successful cases of involving civil society in the convention's implementation but that the participating organisations were not yet truly diverse. In 2009, the Intergovernmental Committee identified three general reasons why, in some countries, civil society participation was less than expected: 1) an organisationally weak cultural sector; 2) an excessively top-down approach by government and public bodies; and 3) poor communication between public bodies, civil society, and the cultural sector.

Civil society includes UNESCO Chairs: professors whose research objectives are linked to those of the 2005 convention. The UNESCO Chair on the Diversity of Cultural Expressions, launched in November 2016, participates in the implementation of the convention and in the development of knowledge.

== Global reports ==
Cover of the 2018 global report, Re-shaping cultural policies: advancing creativity for development

UNESCO has published a series of reports that monitor the outcomes of the 2005 Convention and the progress being made within signatory states.

- UNESCO (2015). Re|shaping cultural policies: a decade promoting the diversity of cultural expressions for development. UNESCO. ISBN 978-92-3-100136-9. (foreword by Irina Bokova)
- UNESCO (2017). Re|shaping cultural policies: advancing creativity for development. UNESCO. ISBN 978-92-3-100256-4. (foreword by Audrey Azoulay)
- Cuny, Lawrence (2020). Freedom & Creativity: Defending art, defending diversity. UNESCO. ISBN 978-92-3-100379-0. (foreword by Ernesto Ottone)
- Conor, Bridget (2021). Gender & creativity: progress on the precipice. UNESCO. ISBN 978-92-3-100444-5. (foreword by Ernesto Ottone)
- UNESCO (2022). Re|shaping policies for creativity: addressing culture as a global public good. UNESCO. ISBN 978-92-3-100503-9. (foreword by Audrey Azoulay)

== Scholarly reception ==
The convention has received both praise and criticism from academic sources. According to Lilian Richieri Hanania of the University of Paris 1 Panthéon-Sorbonne, the convention was significantly watered-down by the negotiation process and so "it has been strongly questioned" whether it can provide a counterbalance to trade agreements. Despite this, she argued in 2014, the core elements of the convention are still relevant and should inform the co-ordination of policy and regulation. The Australian economist David Throsby argued in 2016 that the convention, as a legally binding treaty with many signatories, has achieved much more than the Sustainable Development Goals to advance cultural and economic development in a sustainable context. Reading the national reports on the implementation of the convention, he found that many countries have benefited by making the required policy changes.

Evaluating the convention ten years after its creation, Christiaan De Beukelaer and Miikka Pyykkönen described it as "a useful and important instrument in the debate on cultural diversity" but warn that it is "not broad and sufficient enough to confront cultural diversity as a whole, including challenges concerning human rights and sustainability." Sociologist John Clammer praised the convention for highlighting the role of culture but said it "lacks a hard-edged analysis or concrete policy proposals of how to address the very issues that it itself raises". Cultural policy scholar Johnathan Vickery warned that the democratic, pluralist values motivating the convention could lead to practices undermining those same values: that the document "can be used to legitimise and bolster current patriarchal, traditional, customary, superstitious or religious 'culture'". He described it as setting out a desirable democratic system of cultural governance without specifying how this could be achieved: "it is hard to see how many of the non-democratic members of the UN Assembly could ever implement many of its Articles".

In 2018, the Polish sociologist Dobrosława Wiktor-Mach described the political support for the convention, leading to its rapid ratification by many states, as impressive. She said that the convention "has had a direct impact on current debates on culture and sustainability" but that the interpretation of cultural diversity that has been implemented is narrow – focused on the market for creative goods – compared to the broad language of the declaration. She observed that the International Fund for Cultural Diversity, being reliant on donations, "has difficulties making real change." According to Nancy Duxbury and co-authors, although the convention mentions sustainability, it does not truly integrate sustainability requirements into its account of development. They drew a contrast with the 1996 Our Creative Diversity report by the World Commission on Culture and Development which considered culture not as a sector of the economy but in terms of the values and practices that define desirable futures.

Reviewing the second global report in 2018, Barbara Lovrinić of the Institute for Development and International Relations observed that the reports show that countries have made progress and have come up with new ways to address the strategic issues of promoting cultural diversity, but that the stated long-term goal of reshaping cultural policy was not yet being achieved. She criticised UNESCO for not promoting more public awareness of the 2005 Convention and the Sustainable Development Goals.
