= UNESCO Universal Declaration on Cultural Diversity =

Declaration adopted by UNESCO in 2001

- Created: 2 November 2001
- Location: UNeDocs
- Purpose: Cultural diversity

The Universal Declaration on Cultural Diversity is a declaration adopted unanimously by the General Conference of the United Nations Educational, Scientific and Cultural Organization (UNESCO) at its thirty-first session on 2 November 2001. It calls on nations and institutions to work together for the preservation of culture in all its forms, and for policies that help to share ideas across cultures and inspire new forms of creativity. It interprets "culture" in a broad sense and connects the preservation of culture to central issues of human rights. It defines a role for UNESCO as a space in which different institutions can develop ideas on cultural diversity, which has been a theme of many of UNESCO's activities in the years since. The primary audience of the declaration includes UNESCO's member states as well as international and non-governmental bodies, but other organisations and individuals have also been inspired by it.

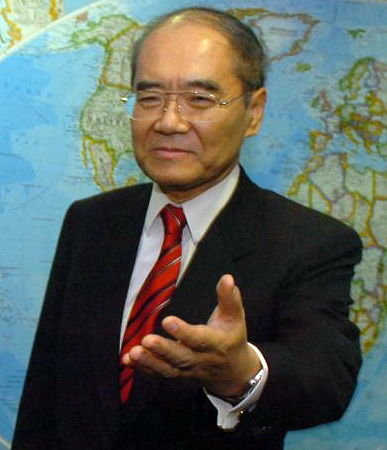
Kōichirō Matsuura, Director-General of UNESCO at the time the declaration was adopted

== Background ==
Writing of the declaration began in October 2000, at the request of the UNESCO's Executive Board. The General Conference of 2 November 2001 which adopted the declaration was the first ministerial-level UNESCO meeting to take place after the September 11th attacks in the United States. In the words of Director-General Kōichirō Matsuura, the declaration allowed states to react against the attacks, and fundamentalism in general, by affirming "that intercultural dialogue is the best guarantee of peace" and rejecting the idea of an inevitable clash of cultures. He named it as "one of the founding documents of the new ethics promoted by UNESCO". The declaration spells out general principles that member states are expected to implement, working with private and civil organisations. It was published with an outline action plan listing various ways to promote cultural diversity.

The declaration was the first international instrument enshrining the value of cultural diversity and intercultural dialogue. As a declaration rather than a convention or a treaty, it is not legally binding on member states and does not require ratification by their own legislatures. Instead, it establishes norms and expectations for the 185 signatory member states to follow.

== Content ==
The declaration defines "culture" as "the set of distinctive spiritual, material, intellectual and emotional features of society or a social group", noting that this includes lifestyles, value systems, traditions, and beliefs in addition to creative works. Earlier UNESCO documents had used "culture" to mean masterpieces; around the time of this declaration, UNESCO started using "culture" in a broader way that matches its use in anthropology. The declaration contains twelve articles.

- Article 1 states that "as a source of exchange, innovation and creativity, cultural diversity is as necessary for humankind as biodiversity is for nature. In this sense, it is the common heritage of humanity and should be recognized and affirmed for the benefit of present and future generations."
- Article 2 identifies cultural pluralism ("policies for the inclusion and participation of all citizens") as a policy response to, and promoter of, cultural diversity.
- Article 3 identifies cultural diversity as one of the roots of development, where "development" means individual flourishing as well as the growth of an economy.
- Article 4 specifies that cultural diversity may not infringe upon human rights guaranteed by international law.
- Article 5 affirms linguistic rights as cultural rights in accordance with International Bill of Human Rights.
- Article 6 affirms freedom of expression, media pluralism and multilingualism.
- Article 7 calls for "heritage in all its forms [to] be preserved, enhanced and handed on to future generations" to support creativity and inter-cultural dialogue.
- Article 8 asks that cultural goods "must not be treated as mere commodities" but must be recognised as bearers of values and meaning.
- Article 9 calls on each state to "create conditions conducive to the production and dissemination of diversified cultural goods" with appropriate policies.
- Article 10 calls for international cooperation so that developing and transitional countries can build viable cultural industries.
- Article 11 affirms the importance of public policy and of partnerships between private, public, and civil institutions, given that market forces alone cannot protect cultural diversity.
- Article 12 defines the role of UNESCO: to incorporate the principles of the declaration in other international bodies, and to act as a forum in which many kinds of organisation can develop ideas and policies in support of cultural diversity.

The action plan connects cultural diversity to human rights more explicitly than the cautious language of the articles. It mentions linguistic diversity, free expression, the protection of indigenous languages and knowledge, and the free movement of people.

== Assessment ==
The American lawyer Juliette Passer describes the declaration as "one of the most beautifully written international documents" whose text and action plan "can be an outstanding educational tool for developing a dialogue about diversity while humanizing globalization."

== Related activities ==
Other UNESCO activities since 2001 continue the theme of protecting and promoting cultural diversity. These include the 2005 Convention on the Protection and Promotion of the Diversity of Cultural Expressions; the 2018 Recommendation concerning the Protection and Promotion of Museums and Collections, their Diversity and their Role in Society; and the designation of 2019 as the International Year of Indigenous Languages. The 2005 convention builds on the 2001 declaration by naming linguistic diversity as a fundamental part of cultural diversity and stating that cultural diversity depends on the free flow of ideas. UNESCO made a submission to a 2002 UN report on Human Rights and Cultural Diversity, quoting part of the declaration to emphasise that cultural diversity must not be used to infringe the rights of minorities and that cultural diversity requires the protection of individual freedoms. In September 2002, the Johannesburg Declaration identified "our rich diversity" as a strength that should be used to achieve sustainable development. A 2003 United Nations resolution named 21 May as the World Day for Cultural Diversity for Dialogue and Development, which continues to be celebrated, and 2021 was designated the International Year of Creative Economy for Sustainable Development.

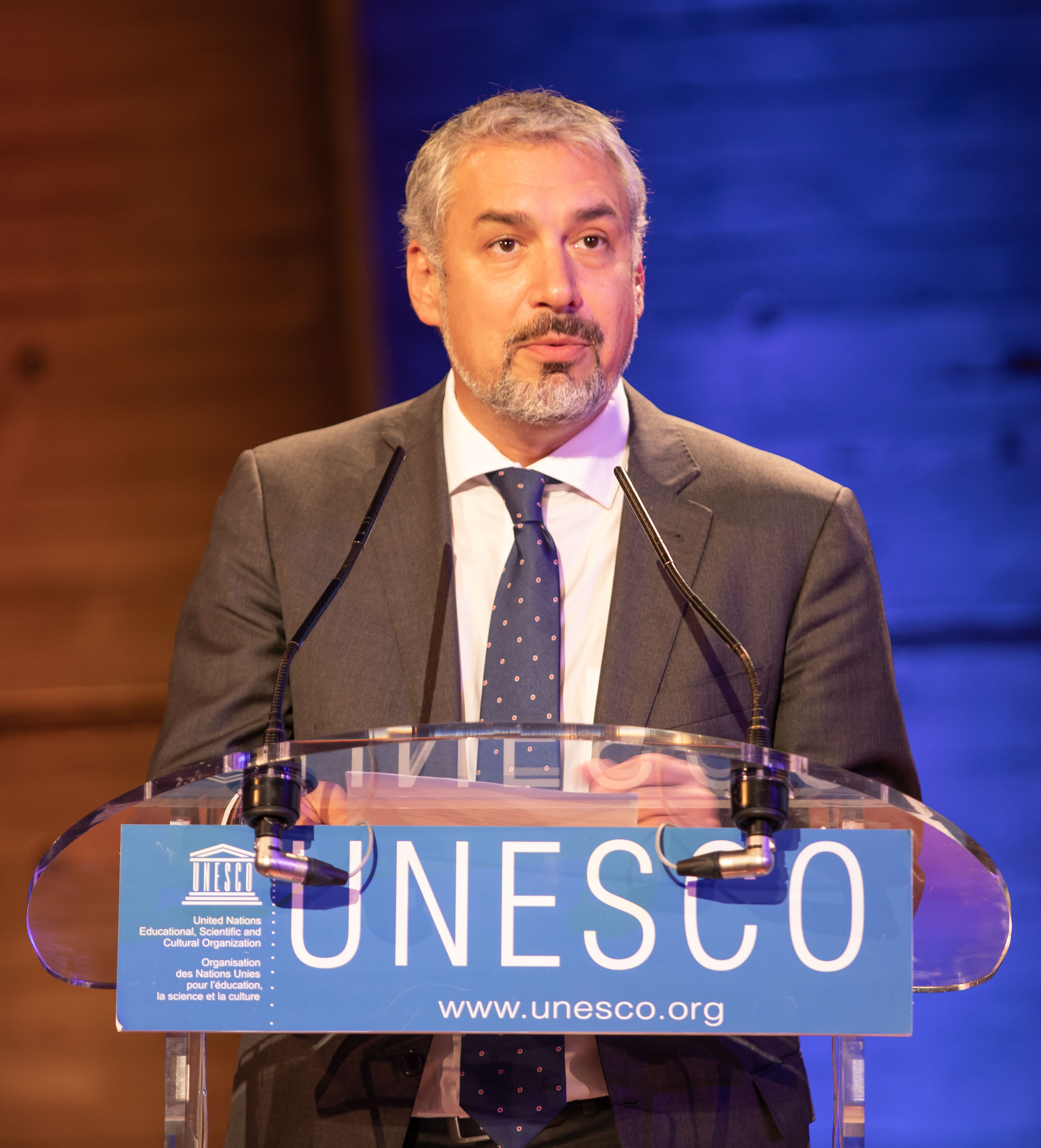
Ernesto Ottone

To celebrate the tenth anniversary of the declaration in 2011, the then UNESCO Director-General Irina Bokova called a special session of the General Conference to discuss progress and announced "Open UNESCO", a permanent interactive exhibition at the organisation's headquarters in Paris. For the declaration's 20th anniversary, an official book was published by the Khalili Foundation, featuring essays on cultural diversity by artists, intellectuals, and leaders. UNESCO Assistant Director-General Ernesto Ottone called for the international community to "create or strengthen social protection of artists, cultural professionals and heritage practitioners as core actors creating and safeguarding [...] cultural diversity around the world." Organisations whose leaders said they were influenced by the declaration included the Commonwealth of Nations, the International Labour Organization, the Caribbean Community, Europeana, and the Prince's Trust. UNESCO also scheduled a World Conference on Cultural Policies and Sustainable Development for September 2022 in Mexico.

The composer and conductor Daniel Barenboim is one of the public figures who identifies the declaration as an inspiration: "Each and every one of us has his or her own responsibility to foster these values in his of her area of action." Barenboim leads the West–Eastern Divan Orchestra — composed of musicians from Israel, the Palestinian territories and Arab countries — which has been designated a UN Global Advocate for Cultural Understanding. Sumi Jo, the South Korean soprano and UNESCO Artist for Peace, says she was inspired by UNESCO's commitment to cultural diversity to use her singing to bring together different cultures.
