= Buczek =

Buczek may refer to:

== Villages in Poland ==
=== Kuyavian-Pomeranian Voivodeship ===
- Buczek, Brodnica County
- Buczek, Świecie County

=== Łódź Voivodeship ===
- Buczek, Brzeziny County
- Buczek, Łask County
- Buczek, Opoczno County

=== West Pomeranian Voivodeship ===
- Buczek, Białogard County
- Buczek, Szczecinek County

=== Other voivodeships ===
- Buczek, Świętokrzyskie Voivodeship (south-central Poland)
- Buczek, Lubusz Voivodeship (west Poland)
- Buczek, Opole Voivodeship (south-west Poland)
- Buczek, Warmian-Masurian Voivodeship (north Poland)

== Other ==
- Buczek (surname)
