= Bełchatów =

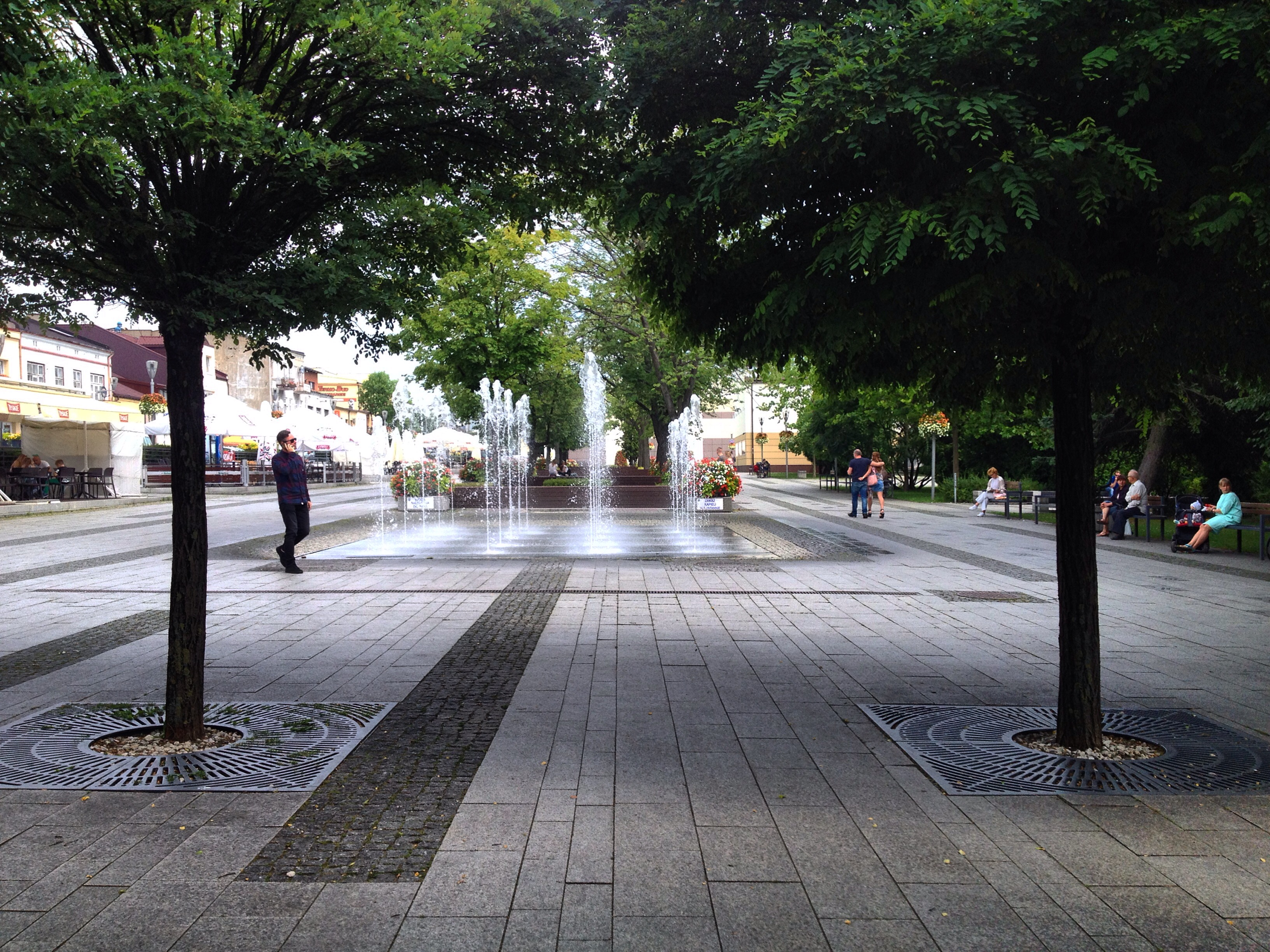
- Gabriel Narutowicz square

- Flag Coat of arms

- Location within Poland
- Coordinates: 51°22′N 19°22′E
- Country: Poland
- Voivodeship: Łódź
- County: Bełchatów
- Gmina: Bełchatów (urban gmina)
- Established: 14th century
- City rights: 1743-1870, 1925

Government
  - City mayor: Patryk Marjan (NN)

Area
  - Total: 34.64 km^{2} (13.37 sq mi)

Population (31 December 2021)
  - Total: 55,583 ▼
  - Density: 1,605/km^{2} (4,160/sq mi)
- Time zone: UTC+1 (CET)
  - Summer (DST): UTC+2 (CEST)
- Postal code: 97-400
- Area code: +48 44
- Vehicle registration: EBE
- Website: http://www.belchatow.pl

Bełchatów ([bɛu̯ˈxatuf]) is a city in central Poland, with a population of 55,583, as of December 2021. It is located in Łódź Voivodeship, 160 kilometres (99 miles) southwest of Warsaw.

The Elektrownia Bełchatów, located in Bełchatów, is the largest coal fueled power plant in Europe and the fifth largest in the world. It produces 27–28 TWh of electricity per year, or 20% of the total power generation in Poland. 8,000 people work directly for the company that runs the coal mine and electricity plants.

The city is also known for the successful volleyball club Skra Bełchatów and local krówki (traditional Polish candy).

== Districts ==
One municipal division of Bełchatów comprises numerous housing estates, including the Budowlanych housing estate located in the central part of the town (close to the "Kultura" cinema, the Municipal Cultural Center, the Town Hall and the church). The estate is also close to the "Rakówka" river and Olszewski Park.

Other municipal divisions of Bełchatów include Dobrzelów District, Grocholice, and the following housing estates:

- Osiedle 1 Maja
- Osiedle Binków
- Osiedle Dolnośląskie
- Osiedle Konopnickiej
- Osiedle Kopernika
- Osiedle Łąkowa
- Osiedle Okrzei
- Osiedle Olsztyńskie
- Osiedle Przytorze
- Osiedle Słoneczne
- Osiedle Tysiąclecia
- Osiedle Wolności
- Osiedle Żołnierzy P.O.W.

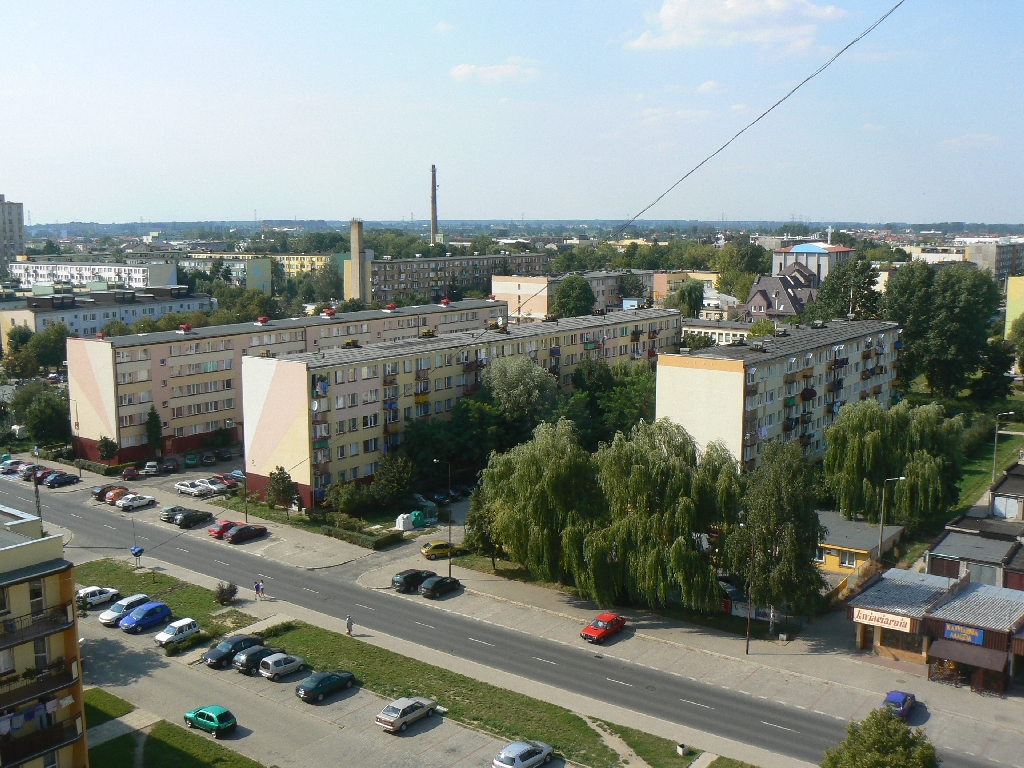
Osiedle 1 Maja

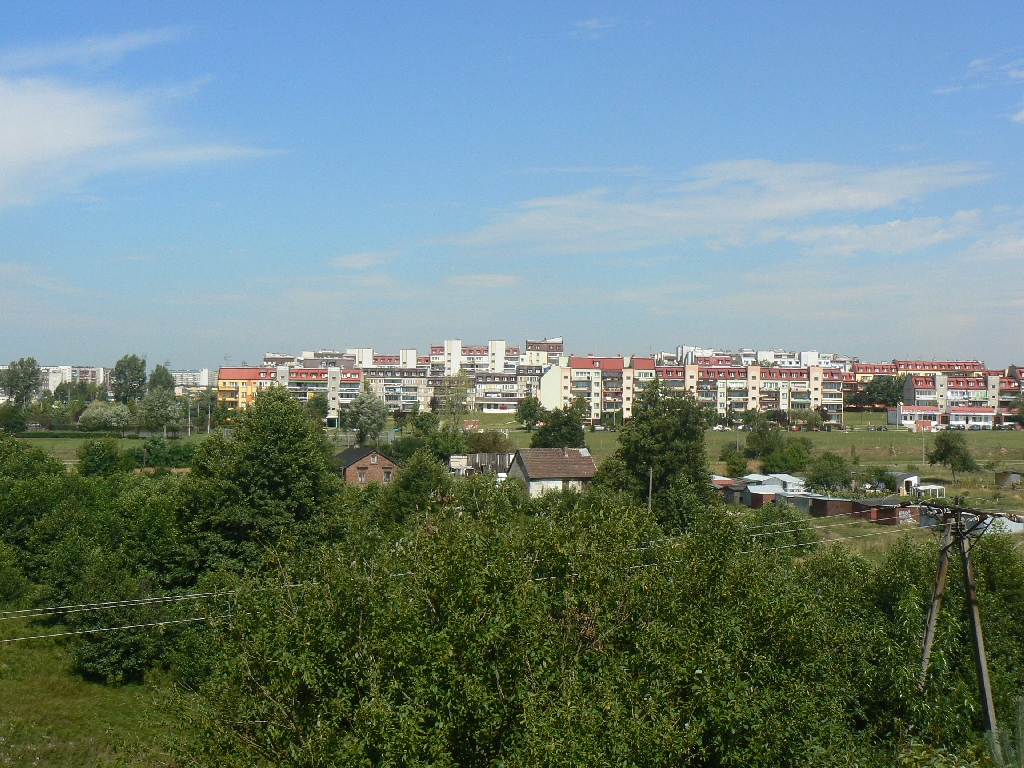
Osiedle Binków in Bełchatów.

== History ==
Grocholice was a private church town, whereas Bełchatów, Dobrzelów and Zdzieszulice were private villages of Polish nobility, administratively located in the Piotrków County in the Sieradz Voivodeship in the Greater Poland Province of the Kingdom of Poland.

== Cuisine ==
The officially protected traditional food of Bełchatów (as designated by the Ministry of Agriculture and Rural Development of Poland) is wyborowa krówka bełchatowska, a local type of krówka (traditional Polish candy).

== Transport ==
National road 74 bypasses Bełchatów to the north. Vovoideship road 484 connects the town to Kamieńsk and to Buczek.

The nearest railway station is in the town of Piotrków Trybunalski to the east.

== Sports ==
- Skra Bełchatów – men's volleyball team playing in PlusLiga (Polish top division), 9–time Polish Champions, 7–time Polish Cup winners.
- GKS Bełchatów – men's football team playing in the lower divisions, which has also played in Ekstraklasa (top division) in the past.

== International relations ==
=== Twin towns and sister cities ===
Bełchatów is twinned with:

- Aubergenville, France
- Myślenice in Poland
- Csongrád in Hungary
- Alcobaça in Portugal
- Tauragė in Lithuania

=== Former twin towns ===
- Sovetsk, Russia

In February 2022, Bełchatów suspended its partnership with the Russian city of Sovetsk as a reaction to the 2022 Russian invasion of Ukraine.

== Notable people ==
- Harry Haft (1925–2007), survivor of the Auschwitz concentration camp and a professional boxer in the United States during 1948–1949

== Gallery ==
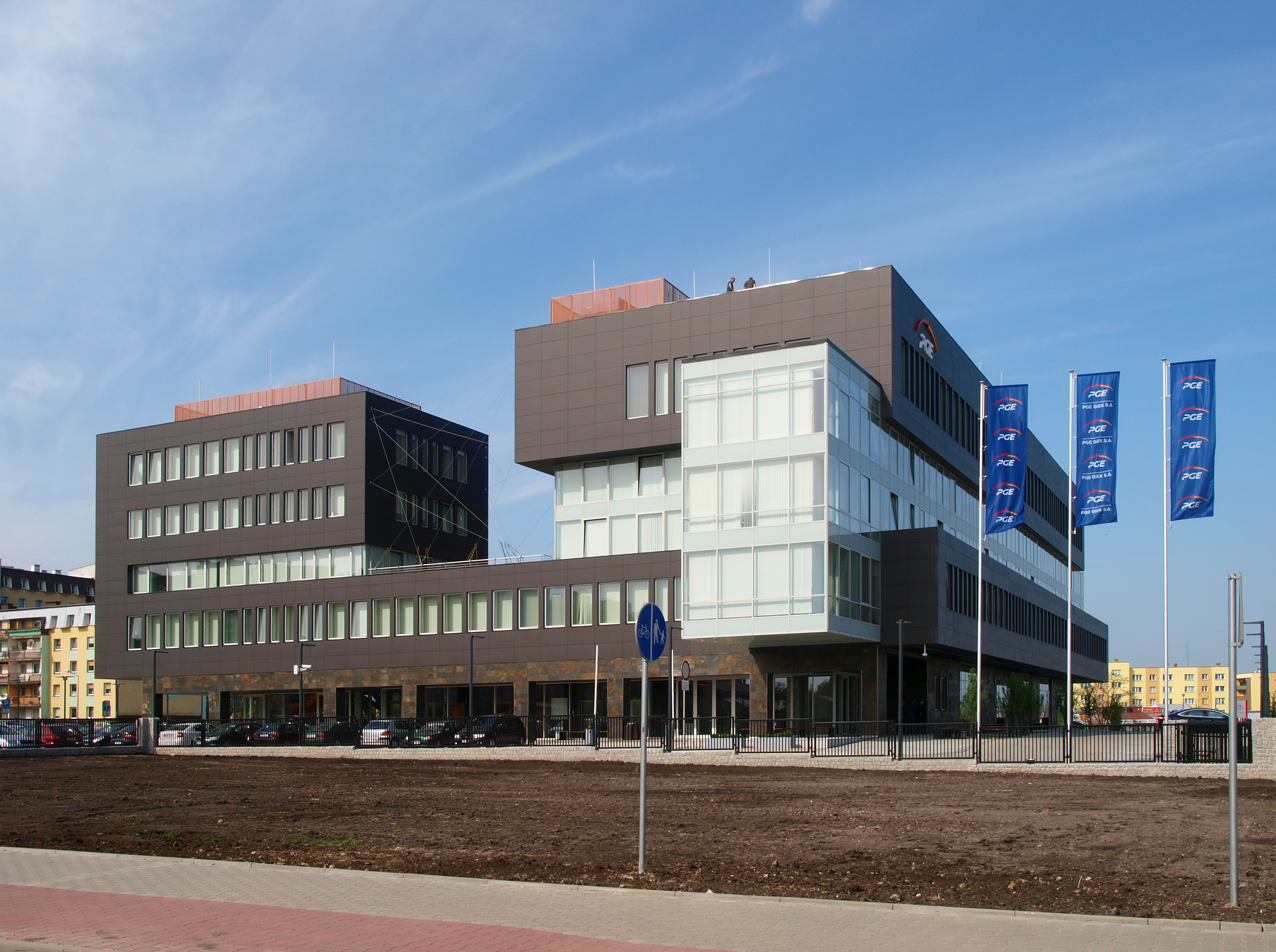
PGE headquarters

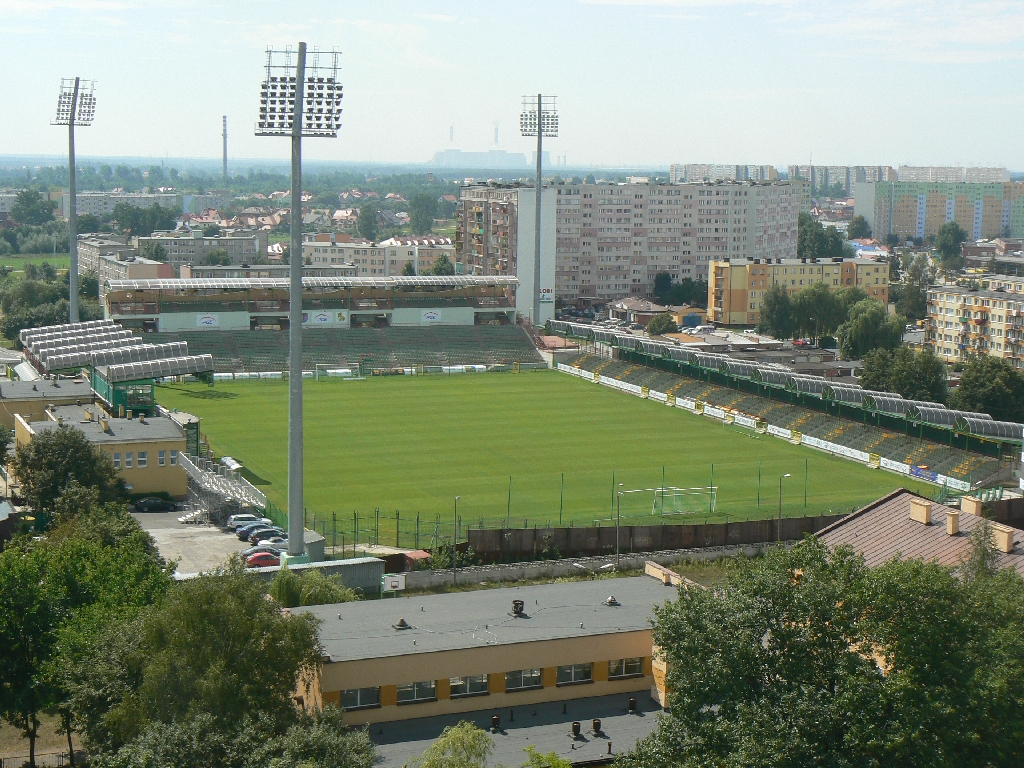
GKS Bełchatów Stadium

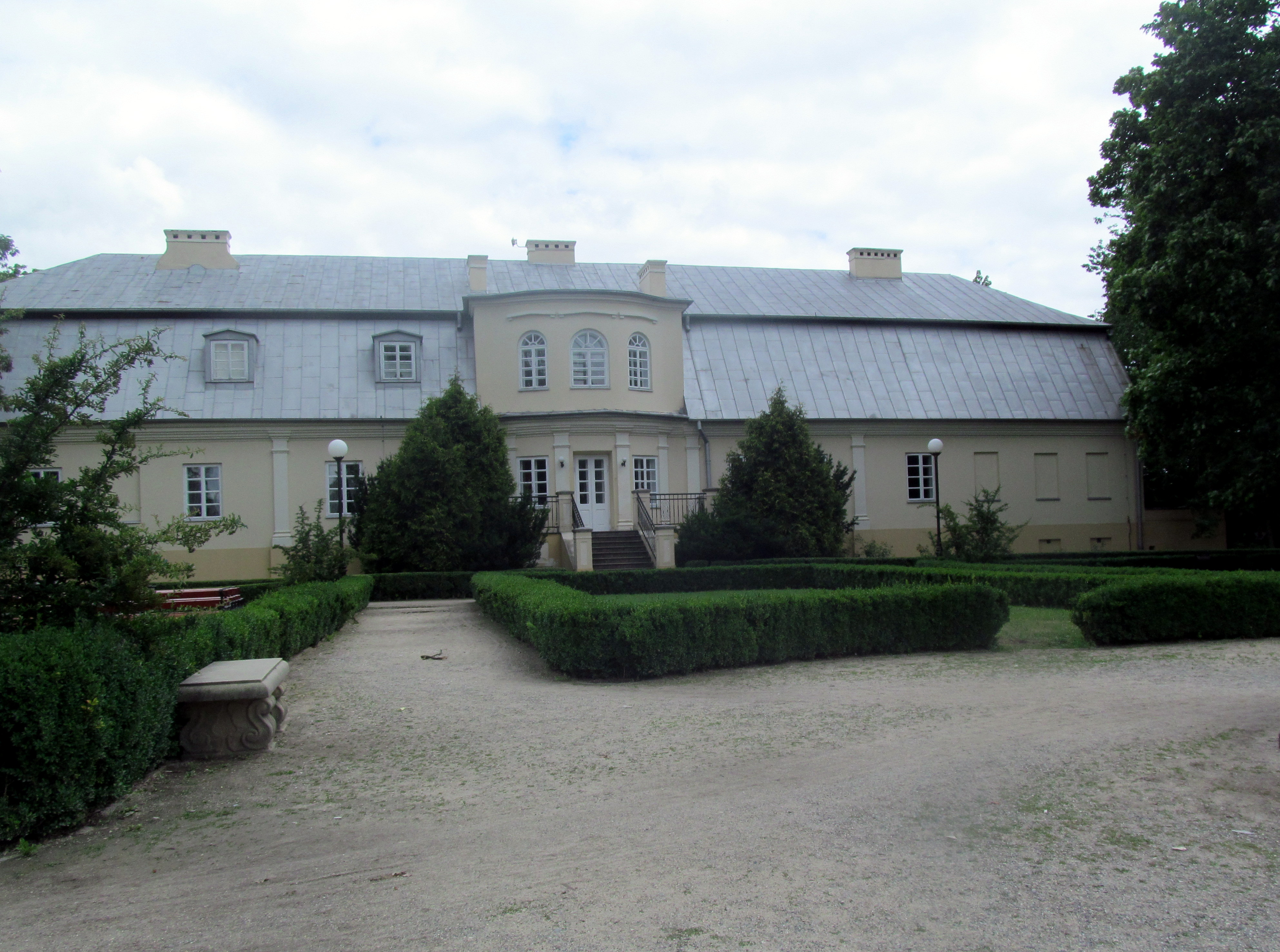
Olszewski Manor

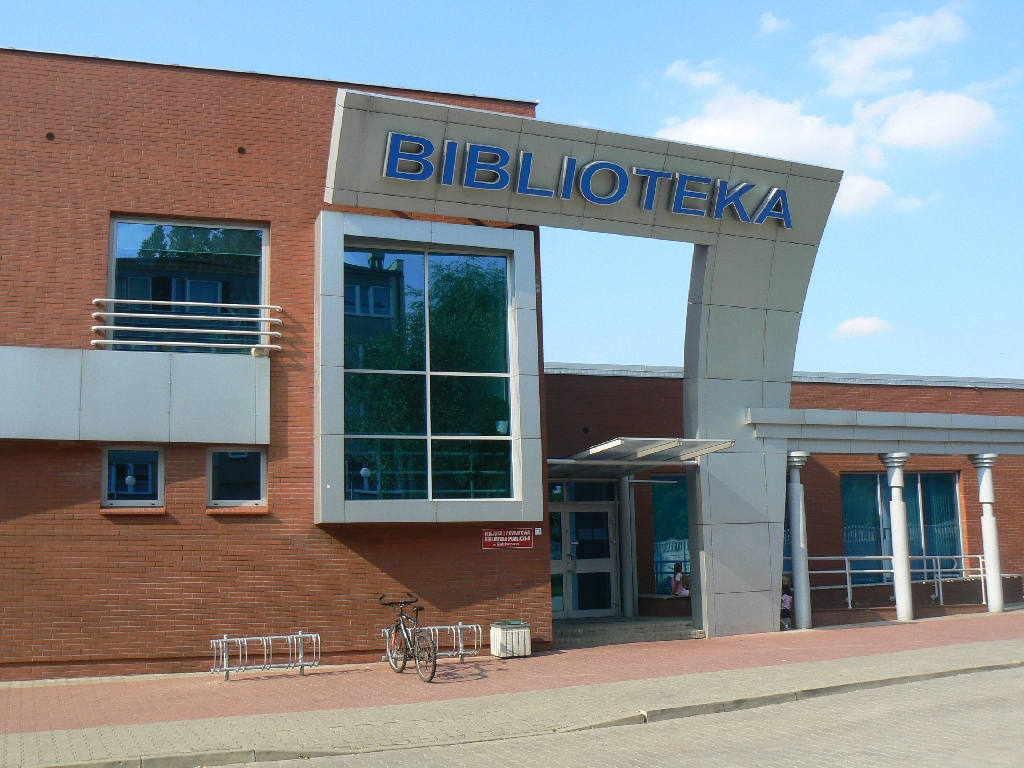
Library

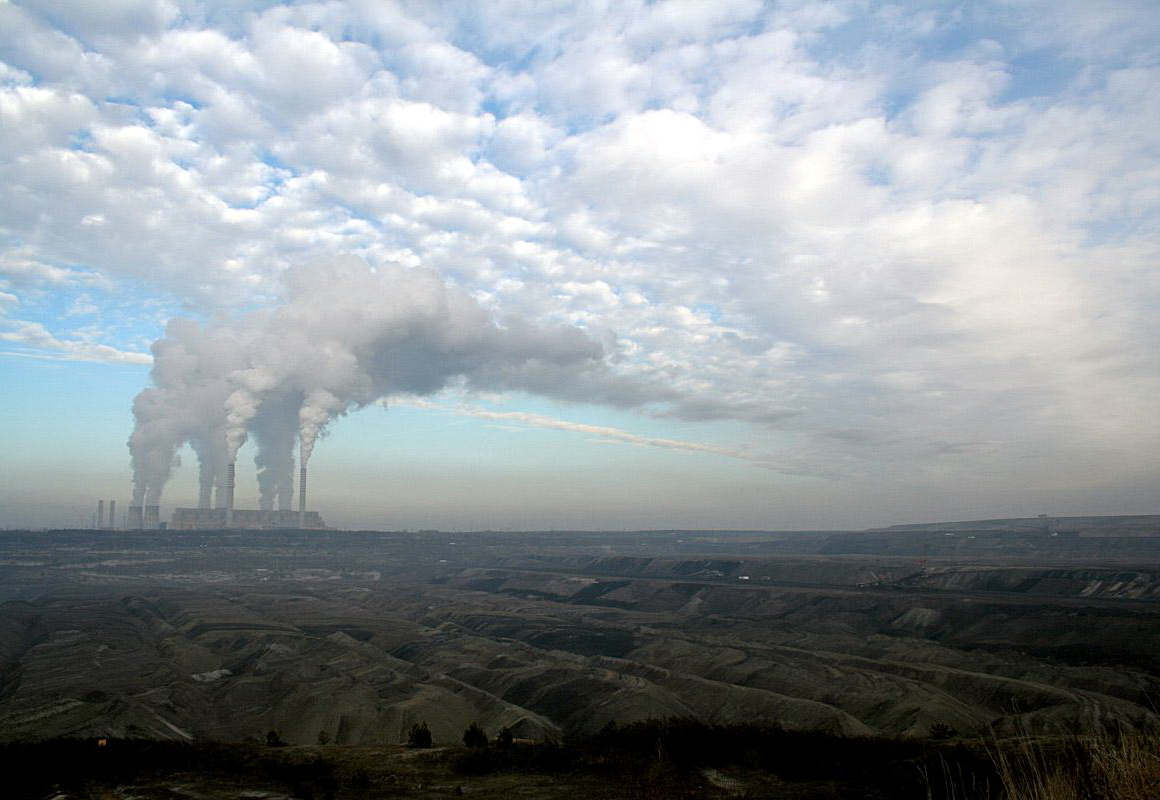
A view of the Power Plants and the Lignite Mine
