= Gmina Ujazd =

Gmina Ujazd may refer to either of the following administrative districts in Poland:

- Gmina Ujazd, Opole Voivodeship
- Gmina Ujazd, Łódź Voivodeship
