= Księży Las, Opole Voivodeship =

Księży Las
- Village
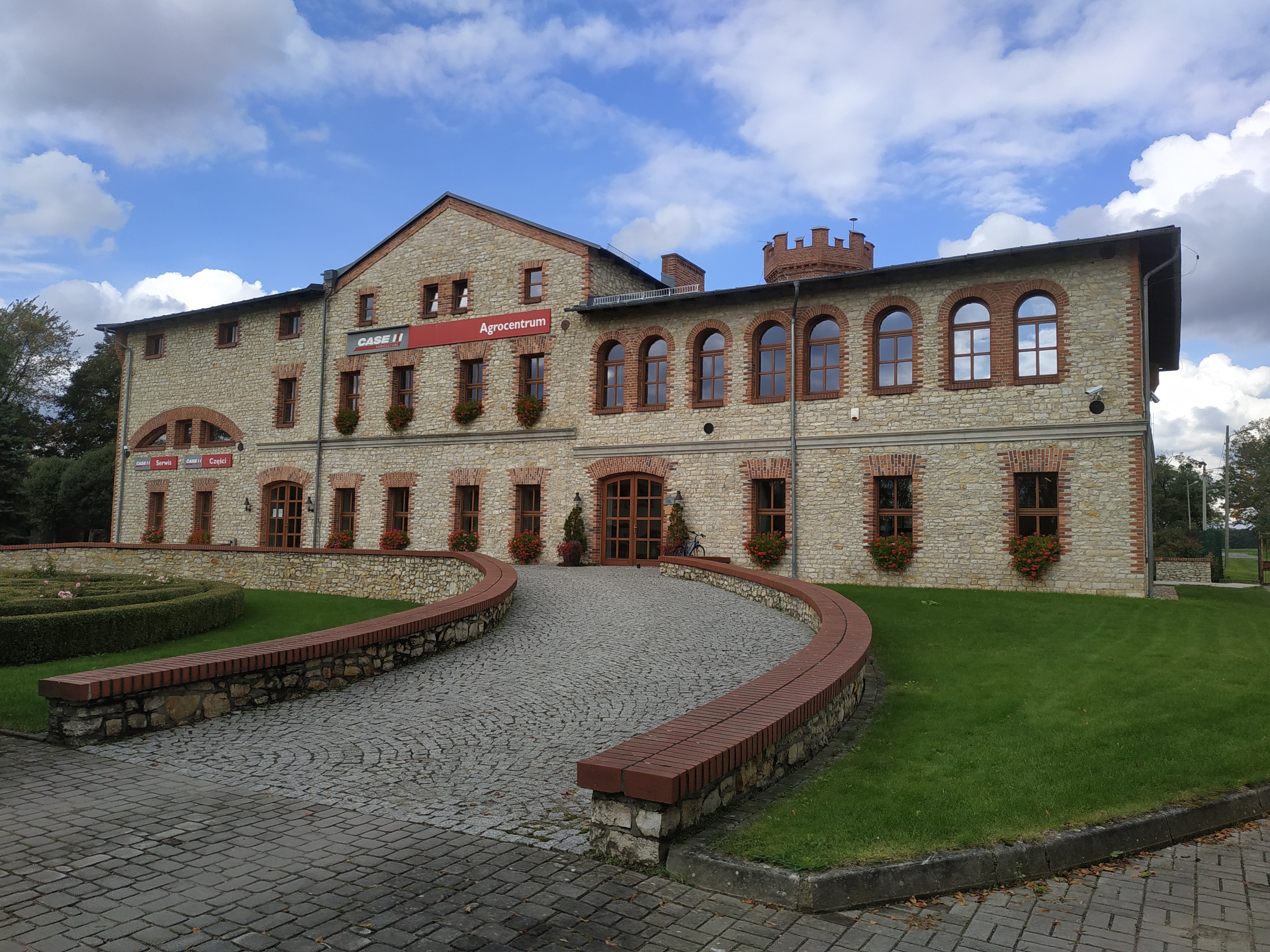

- Location within Poland
- Coordinates: 50°28′N 18°17′E
- Country: Poland
- Voivodeship: Opole
- County: Strzelce
- Gmina: Ujazd

Księży Las [ˈkɕɛ̃ʐɨ ˈlas] (German: Xionslas) is a village in the administrative district of Gmina Ujazd, within Strzelce County, Opole Voivodeship, in south-western Poland.
