= Ujazd, Opole Voivodeship =

Ujazd
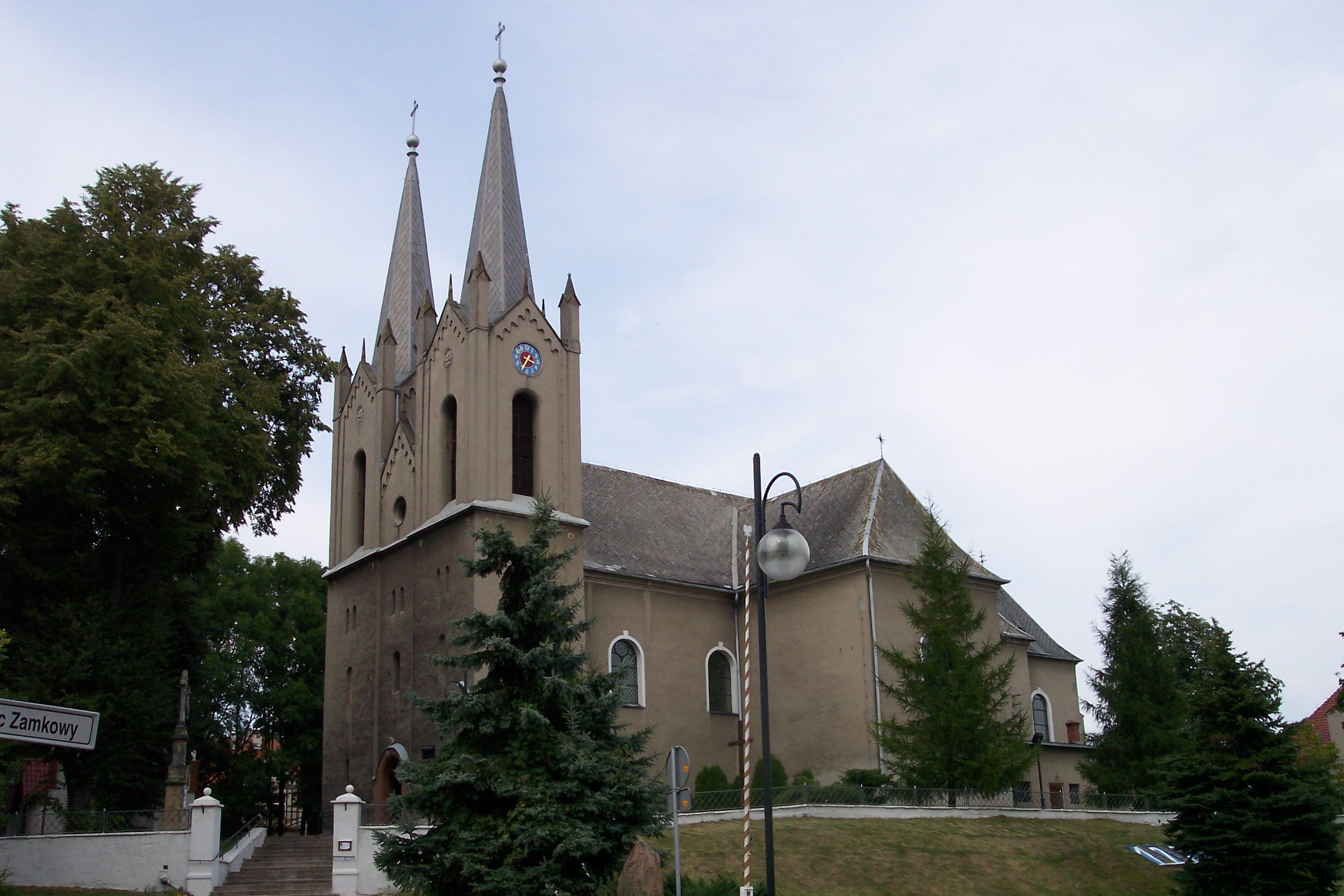
- Saint Andrew Church

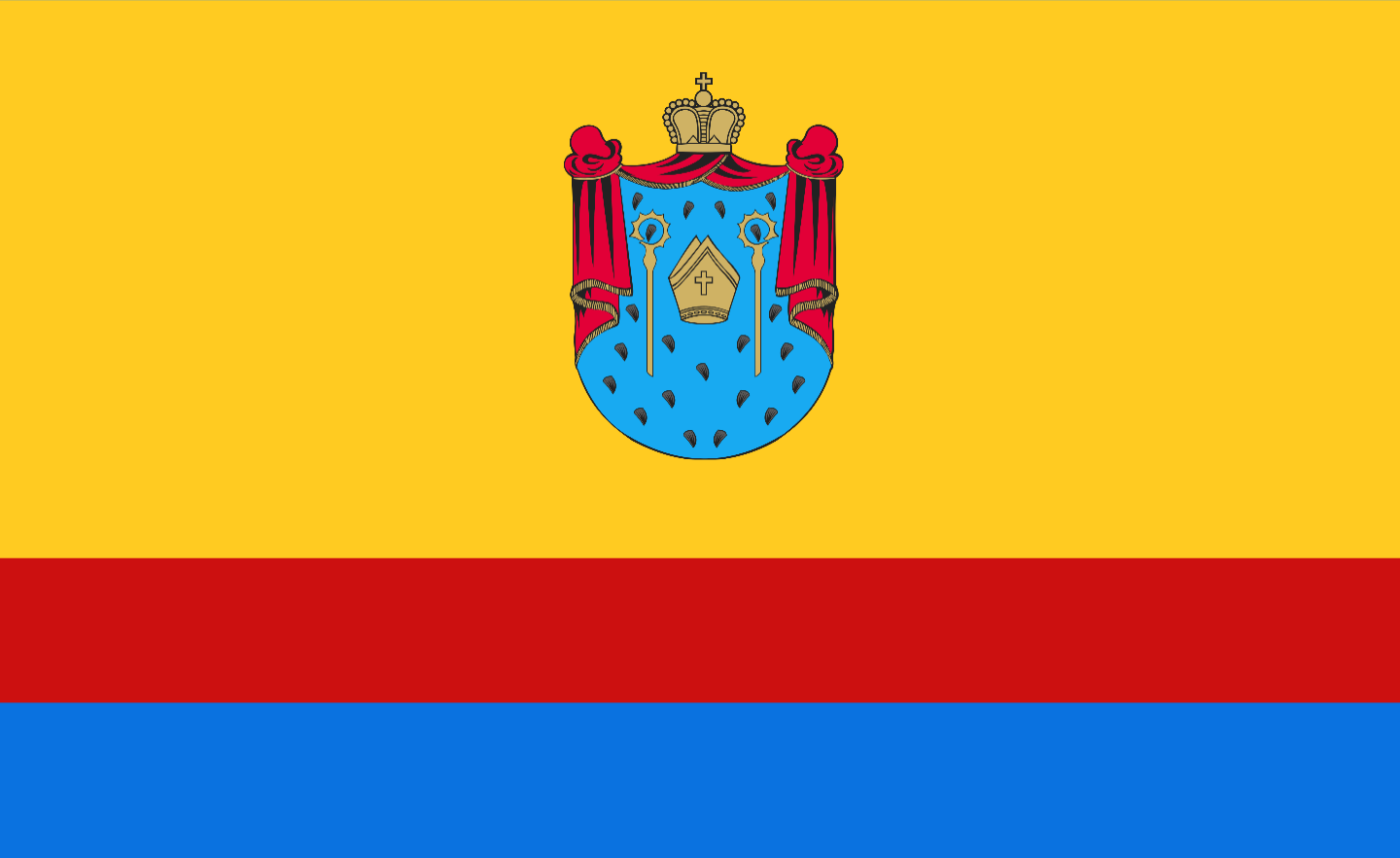
- Flag Coat of arms

- Location within Poland
- Coordinates: 50°23′26″N 18°21′15″E
- Country: Poland
- Voivodeship: Opole
- County: Strzelce
- Gmina: Ujazd
- First mentioned: 1155
- Town rights: 1223

Area
  - Total: 14.69 km^{2} (5.67 sq mi)

Population (2019-06-30)
  - Total: 1,763
  - Density: 120.0/km^{2} (310.8/sq mi)
- Time zone: UTC+1 (CET)
  - Summer (DST): UTC+2 (CEST)
- Postal code: 47-143
- Website: http://www.ujazd.pl

Ujazd [ˈujast] (German: Ujest) is a town in Strzelce County in the Opole Voivodeship in southern Poland. Population 1,647.

The town lies on bank of the river Kłodnica. Tourist attractions in the town include the Ujazd Castle (formerly used by bishops of Wrocław) and two churches: 17th-century Baroque Saint Andrew church and 19th-century Gothic Revival Visitation church.

== History ==
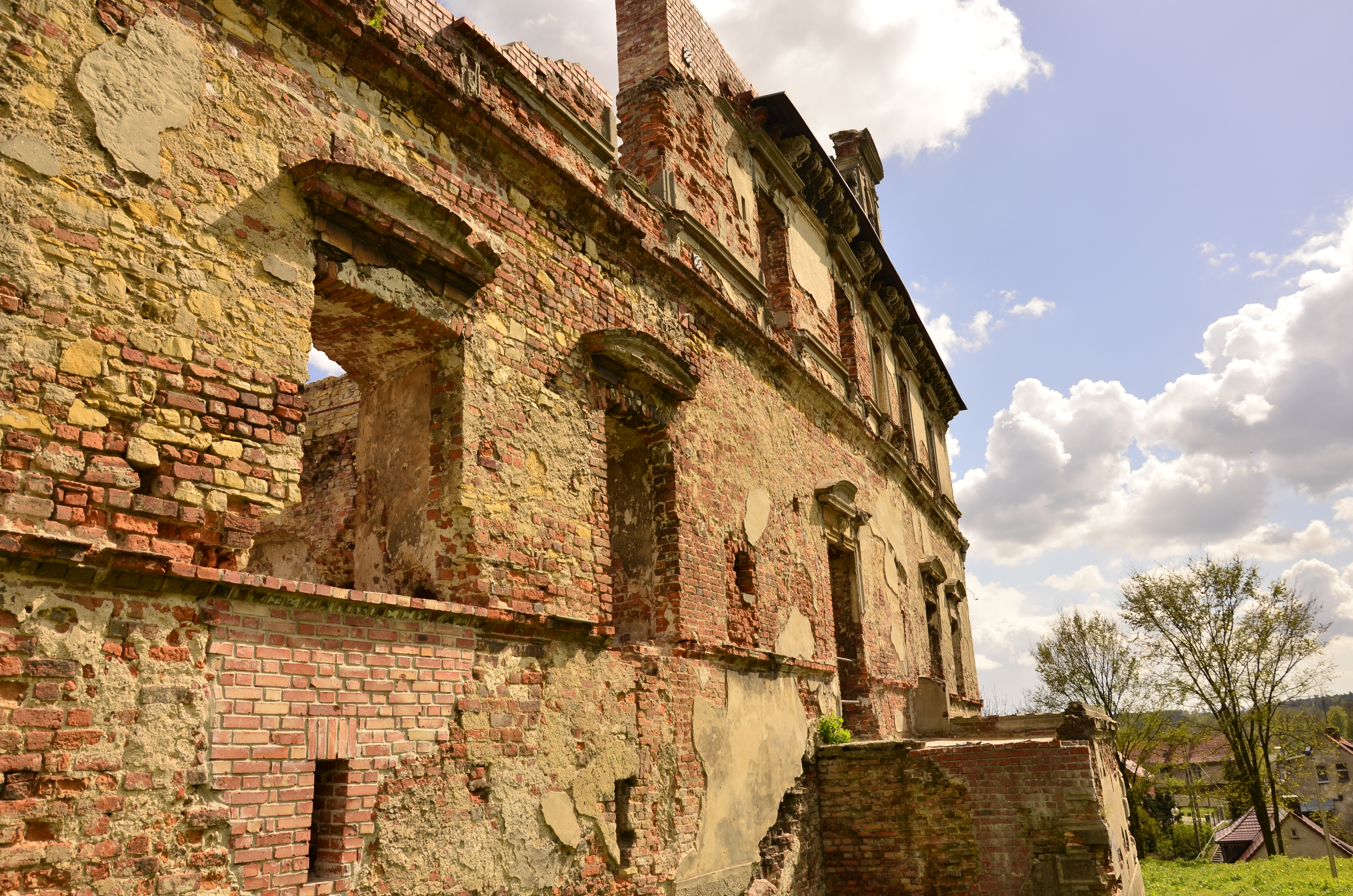
Ruins of the medieval castle

The oldest known mention of Ujazd dates back to a document of Pope Adrian IV from 1155, when it was part of the Piast-ruled Kingdom of Poland. It was granted town rights in 1223 by Bishop of Wrocław Wawrzyniec. Already in the 13th century, a Catholic parish and municipal council existed in the town. Its name is of Polish origin.

The town suffered during the Thirty Years' War (1618–1648) and the Silesian Wars (1740–1763) and in 1666, 1676, 1770 it was hit by fires. It was captured by Prussia in 1740 and annexed afterwards. In 1838 the town passed to the family of Hohenlohe–Öhringen, a branch (1823) of that of Hohenlohe-Ingelfingen. Prince Hugo of Hohenlohe-Öhringen was the first to take the title of duke of Ujest in 1861, and in 1897 was succeeded by his son Christian Kraft (born 1848). The duke was an hereditary member of the upper houses of Württemberg and Prussia. Since 1871, it was also part of Germany.

Until the end of the 18th century the town's population was overwhelmingly Polish, however, as a result of German colonization and Germanisation, in 1900, 75% of the populace was German-speaking. In the 1921 Upper Silesia plebiscite, 1,384 (89.6%) residents of the town voted to remain in Germany and 161 (10.4%) voted to join Poland. The town was captured by Polish insurgents during the Silesian Uprisings in 1921, however it remained part of Germany in the interwar period.

In 1937, during a massive Nazi campaign of renaming of placenames, it was renamed Bischofstal to remove traces of Polish origin. In the final stages of World War II, on January 22, 1945, the Germans executed several dozen of prisoners of the Auschwitz concentration camp in the town. 90 Polish citizens were murdered by Nazi Germany in the town during the war. 70% of the town infrastructure was destroyed in the war. After the war the town became again part of Poland and its original name was restored.

== Twin towns – sister cities ==
See twin towns of Gmina Ujazd.
