= Grzeboszowice =

- Village
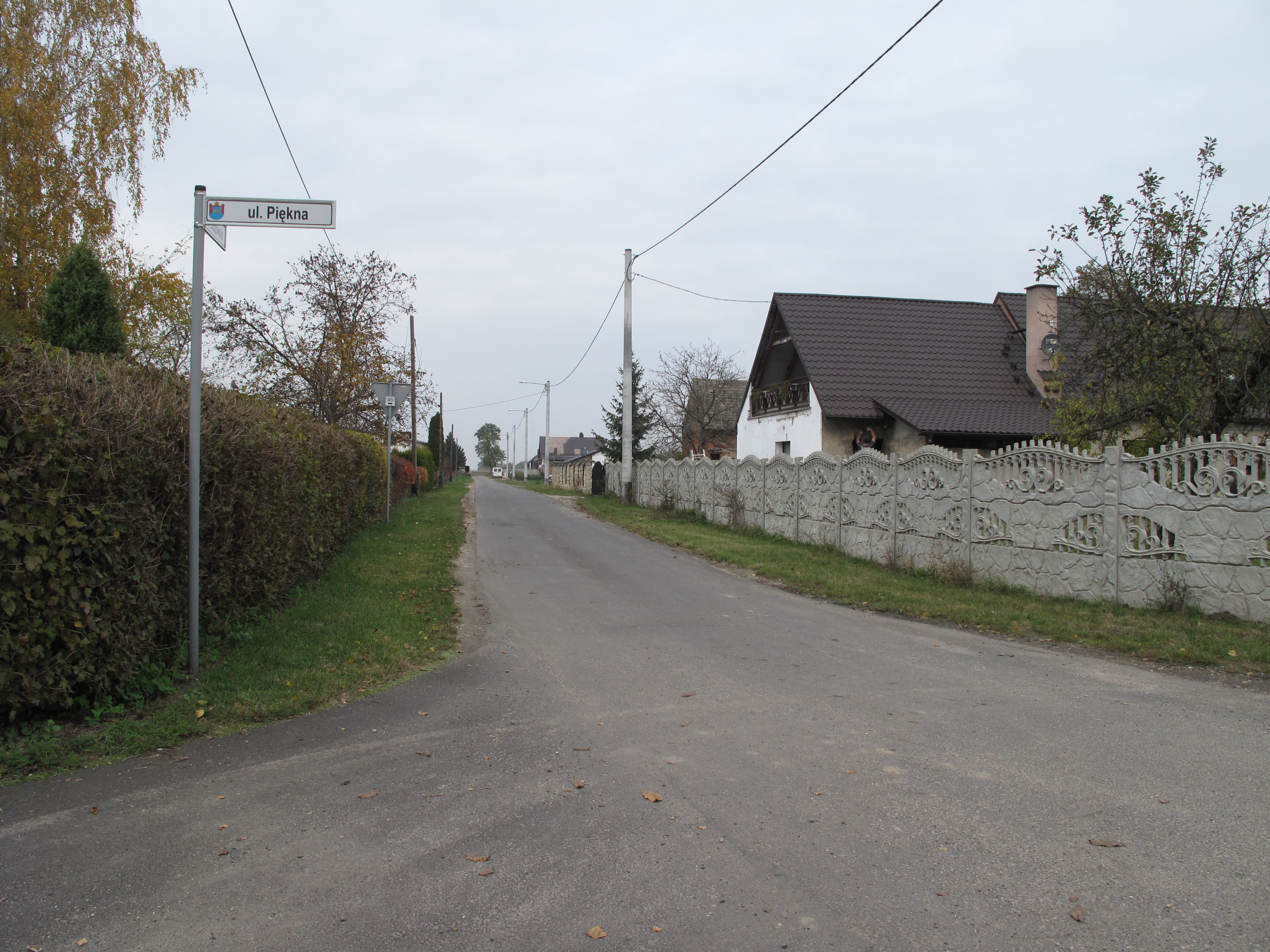
- Street

- Location within Poland
- Coordinates: 50°27′59″N 18°20′4″E
- Country: Poland
- Voivodeship: Opole
- County: Strzelce
- Gmina: Ujazd
- Time zone: UTC+1 (CET)
  - Summer (DST): UTC+2 (CEST)
- Vehicle registration: OST

Grzeboszowice [ɡʐɛbɔʂɔˈvit͡sɛ] (German: Greboschowitz) is a village in the administrative district of Gmina Ujazd, within Strzelce County, Opole Voivodeship, in southern Poland.
