= Stary Ujazd =

Stary Ujazd Alt Ujest
- Village
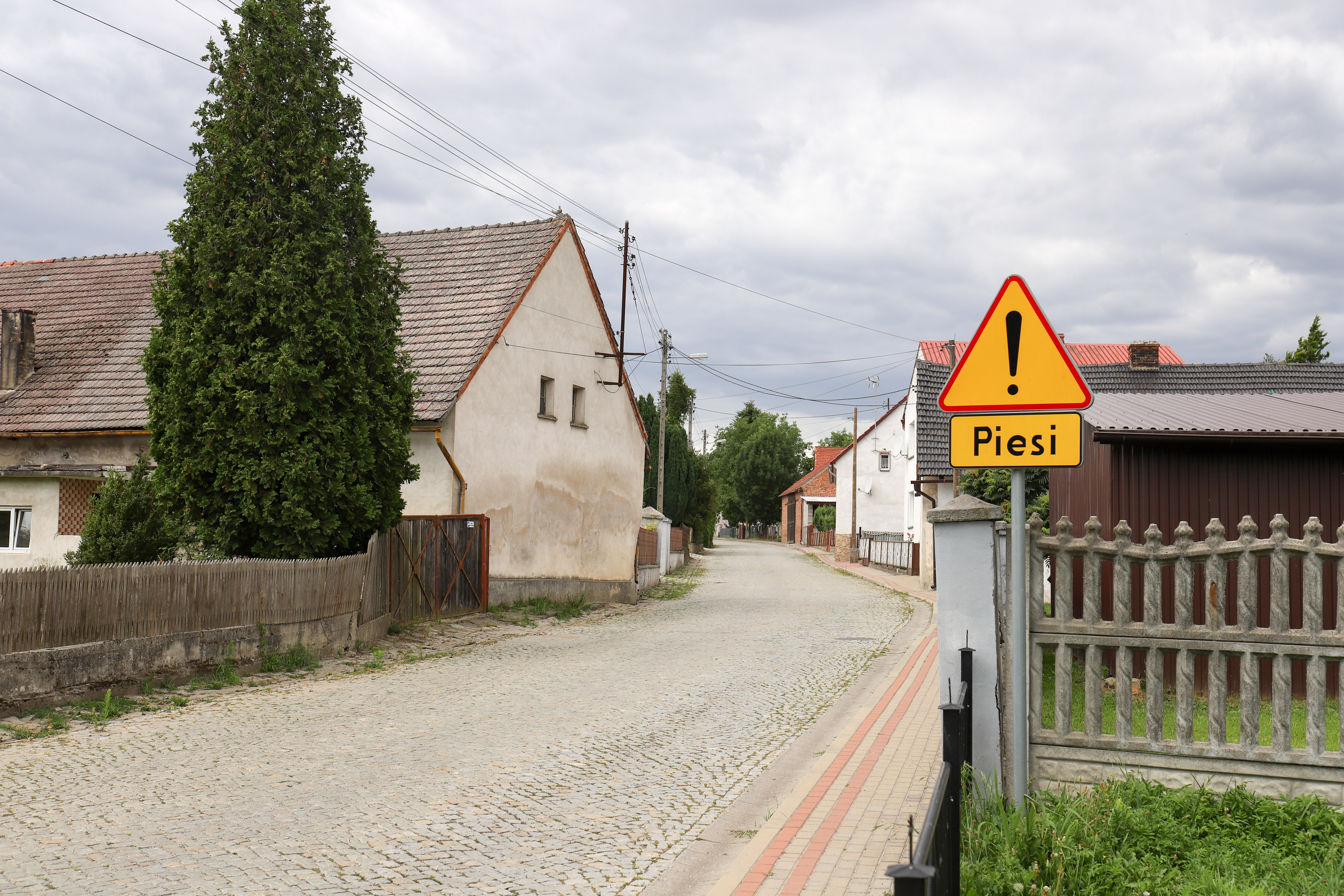

- Location within Poland
- Coordinates: 50°25′N 18°21′E
- Country: Poland
- Voivodeship: Opole
- County: Strzelce
- Gmina: Ujazd
- Time zone: UTC+1 (CET)
  - Summer (DST): UTC+2 (CEST)
- Vehicle registration: OST

Stary Ujazd ([ˈstarɨ ˈujast], additional name in German: Alt Ujest) is a village in the administrative district of Gmina Ujazd, within Strzelce County, Opole Voivodeship, in southern Poland.
