= Corpus Christi procession =

Catholic Eucharistic procession

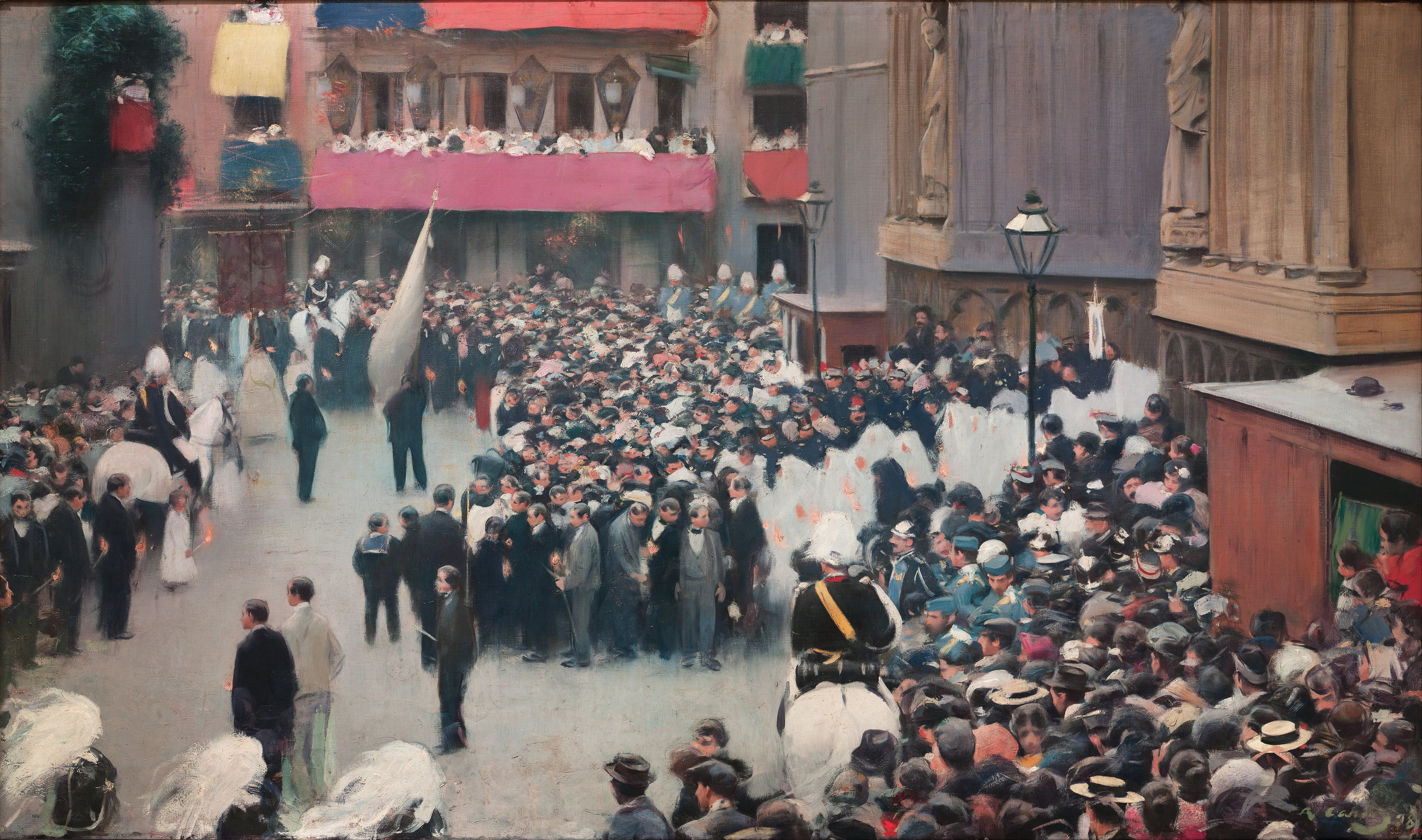
The Corpus Christi Procession Leaving the Church of Santa Maria del Mar by Ramon Casas

Corpus Christi processions are Eucharistic processions held on the Thursday of the Feast of Corpus Christi or the following Sunday. They are held at the end of Mass and the Blessed Sacrament is generally displayed in a monstrance. The procession is followed by Benediction.

During the procession, the consecrated host is displayed in a monstrance held aloft by a member of the clergy. At the end of the procession, Benediction of the Blessed Sacrament is imparted. Many Corpus Christi guilds were formed to support these processions which due to the seasonal conditions in early summer were often a high point of the area's religious year.

The first Corpus Christi procession was instituted in 1316 by Pope John XXII and was held in Orvieto due to its association with the miracle of Bolsena.

== History ==
Corpus Christi processions developed in the medieval era "as an outgrowth of the effiaccy attached to looking upon the consecrated species". In 1336, "the Milanese procession was ordered to include ecclesiastical dignitaries, hermits, friars, monks, secular clergy, and the archbishop on a white horse". By the end of the 14th century, churches, civic authorities, confraternities, and guilds were involved in organizing Corpus Christi processions.

At the time of the Reformation, Martin Luther was particularly hostile to Corpus Christi processions. Many personal opinions of Martin Luther were not adopted by the Evangelical-Lutheran Churches, however, and because Evangelical-Lutheranism retained much of the pre-Reformation liturgical and devotional practices, the Evangelical-Lutheran Reformation is generally considered to be the most conservative among the Protestant traditions. The Feast of Corpus Christi was retained in the calendars of the Lutheran Church until about 1600. Evangelical-Lutherans were recorded to have prominent celebrations of the Feast of Corpus Christi in Dessau (1532), Brandenburg (1540), and Brandenburg-Ansbach-Kulmbach (1548). The Feast of Corpus Christi continues to be celebrated in certain Evangelical-Lutheran churches, particularly those of Evangelical Catholic churchmanship.

Corpus Christi processions, in some areas, did become a focus for tensions between Catholics and Protestants during the Counter Reformation. The processions were seen as a threat to the Protestant church in Thorn in Poland. From 1682, St Mary's Church had to be guarded by an Evangelical-Lutheran Bürgerwehr (militia) during the Corpus Christi processions, as the assembled Catholics might have occupied this church as well. Further violent conflicts occurred in 1688 and 1721.

== Opposition ==
=== Left Wing Anticlericalism ===
The 1896 Barcelona Corpus Christi procession bombing was an attack carried out on the Feast of Corpus Christi procession in Barcelona on 7 June 1896 and was attributed to anarchists. It killed 12 people.

=== United Kingdom ===
Corpus Christi processions were formally banned under the terms of the Roman Catholic Relief Act 1829 although in practice they were becoming more common in the UK in the nineteenth century.

In 1901 the evangelical preacher Arthur Trew was sentenced to twelve months' hard labour after he incited his supporters to riot in a Corpus Christi procession in Belfast. In 1908 a Eucharistic Congress held in London had to abandon plans for a public procession after a personal intervention from the Prime Minister Herbert Asquith, although a procession was still held without the Eucharist where members of religious orders processed in ordinary clothes ostentatiously carrying their religious habits which they were legally not allowed to wear in public in silent protest.

In 1924 the Corpus Christi procession in Carfin, Scotland, was successfully blocked from using the public roads by the local MP and Orangeman Hugh Ferguson citing the 1908 precedent, which became one of the triggers for the Roman Catholic Relief Act 1926 which explicitly repealed the ban on Catholic processions.

== Examples ==
=== Italy ===
==== Rome ====
A notable Eucharistic procession is that presided over by the Pope each year in Rome, where it begins at the Archbasilica of St. John Lateran and concludes with Benediction passes at the Basilica of Saint Mary Major. Corpus Christi wreaths, which are made of flowers, are hung on the doors and windows of the Christian faithful, in addition to being erected in gardens and fields.

==== Cagli ====
In Cagli's procession, the city's streets are carpeted with flowers, arranged by citizens and worshippers as a demonstration of popular piety, for the procession in which the priest carries the consecrated host, under a rich canopy, accompanied by members of the Confraternity of the Blessed Sacrament.

=== Philippines ===
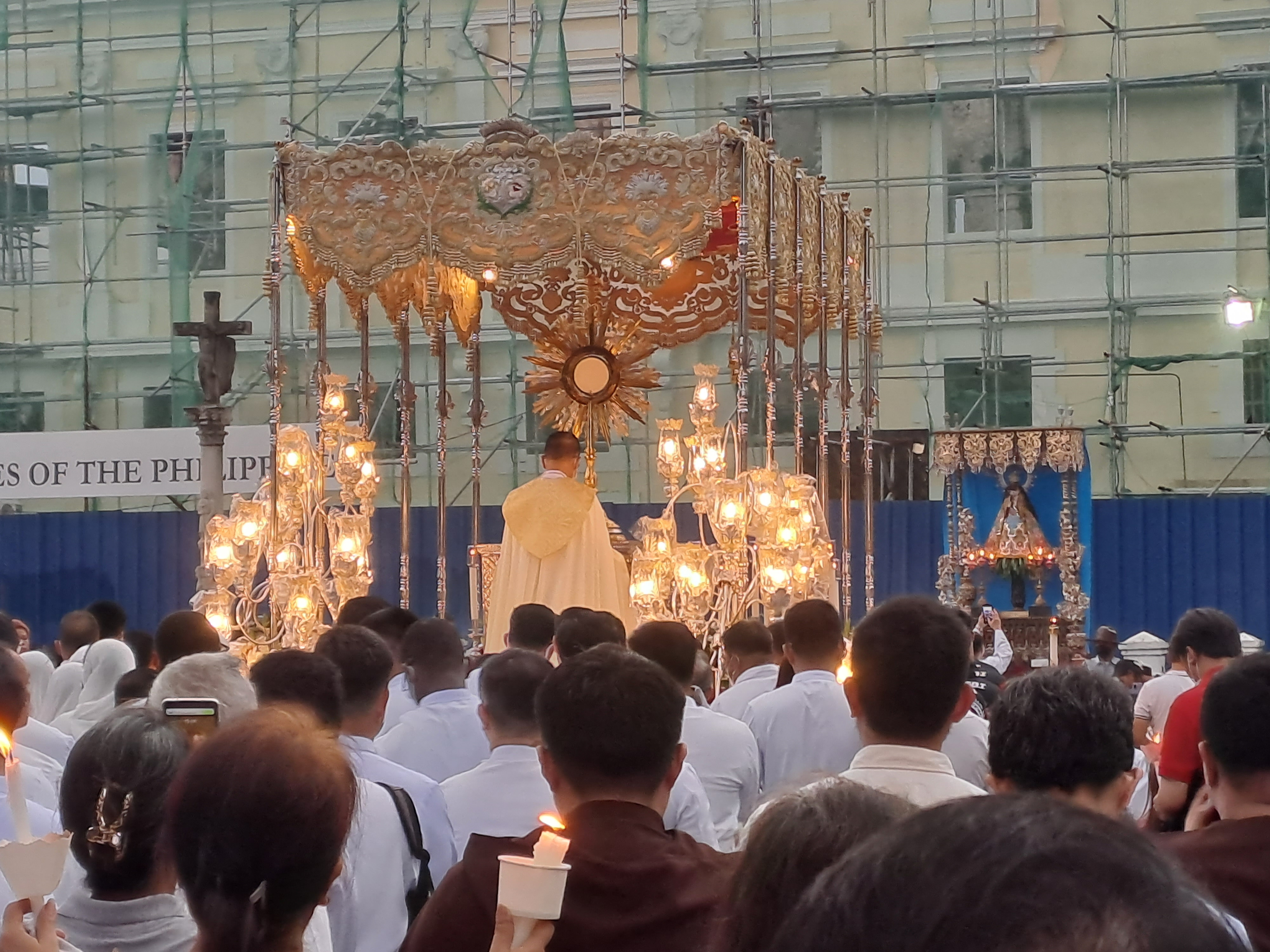
A procession in Manila, Philippines, where the monstrance is placed on a carriage (carroza), rather than being carried by a cleric. The Archbishop of Manila, Cardinal Jose Advincula, instead kneels before the Blessed Sacrament during the entire procession.

A notable procession in the Philippines is that of the Archdiocese of Manila. The archbishop celebrates a mid-afternoon Mass at the Shrine of the Blessed Sacrament in Santa Cruz before presiding over a procession to the Manila Cathedral.

=== Poland ===
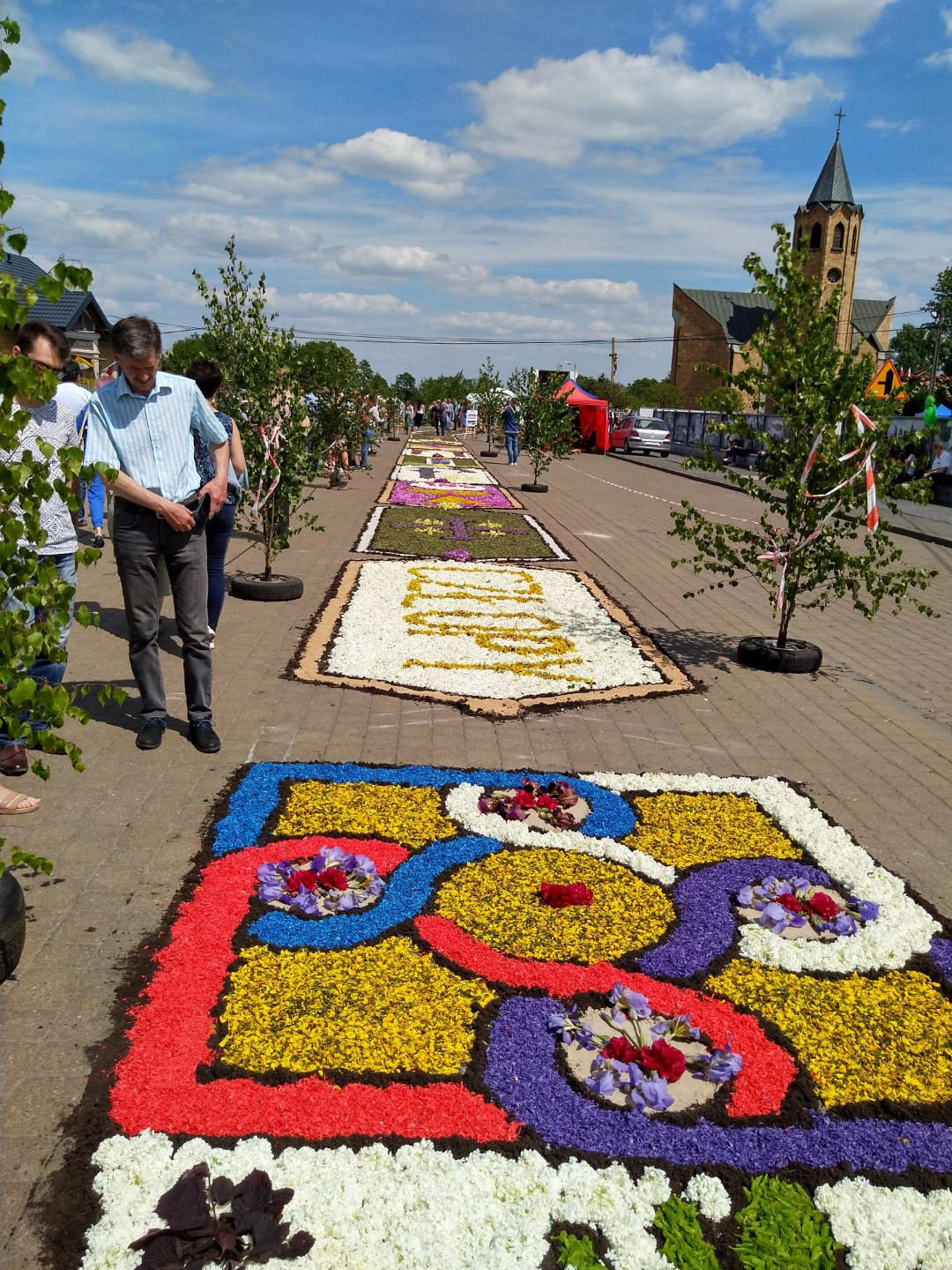
Spycimierz's main square on the day of Corpus Christi, June 2021

Spycimierz in central Poland is known for the flower carpets that members of the local parish have been arranging for the Corpus Christi procession for decades. There are similar flower carpets in other Southern Polish villages such as Klucz, Olszowa, Zalesie Śląskie and Zimna Wódka.

In 2018, the tradition was entered into the National List of Intangible Cultural Heritage. In March 2020 Poland nominated the Flower carpets tradition for inclusion on the Representative List of the Intangible Cultural Heritage of Humanity maintained by UNESCO. On 15 November 2021, a UNESCO Evaluation Body issued a document containing the examination of nominations for inscription on the Representative List of the Intangible Cultural Heritage of Humanity in 2021. The Evaluation Body recommended that the Flower carpets tradition for Corpus Christi processions be inscribed on the Representative List of the Intangible Cultural Heritage of Humanity. The final decision on the inscription was taken on 15 December 2021 by the Intergovernmental Committee for the Safeguarding of Intangible Cultural Heritage.

The history of flower carpets in Spycimierz goes back to a hard to specify period. Although the oldest written account of this custom comes from the parish chronicle dating back to 1957, oral communication is much older. For the oldest message, one should acknowledge the legend of the appearance of this custom along with the return of soldiers from Napoleon to their native village. The composition of the flower carpets has changed and evolved over the years. At first, yellow sand and twigs were used, so the old decoration was modest. Later, flowers began to be used, and the current way of dressing the route took shape after 1945. The colorful carpet of live flowers is laid by parishioners along the Corpus Christi road, which is about 1 kilometre long. A solemn procession passes over it at 5 p.m.

=== Spain ===
==== Ponteareas ====
Dating back to 1857, Ponteareas traditionally celebrates the feast with a procession of the Holy Sacrament along floral carpets laid in the streets. In 1968, the festival was declared a festival of Tourist Interest, in 1980 of National Tourist Interest, and in 2009 of International Tourist Interest, joining other famous Spanish celebrations such as Fallas and the Tomatina.

== Sources ==
- MacCulloch, Diarmaid (2009). A History of Christianity: The First Three Thousand Years. London: Allen Lane. ISBN 978-0-7139-9869-6.
- Rosie, Michael John (2001). Religion and Sectarianism in Modern Scotland (Doctor of Philosophy thesis). University of Edinburgh.
- Weiser, Francis X. (1956). The Holyday Book. Harcourt, Brace and Company.
