= Zimna Wódka =

Zimna Wódka Kaltwasser
- Village
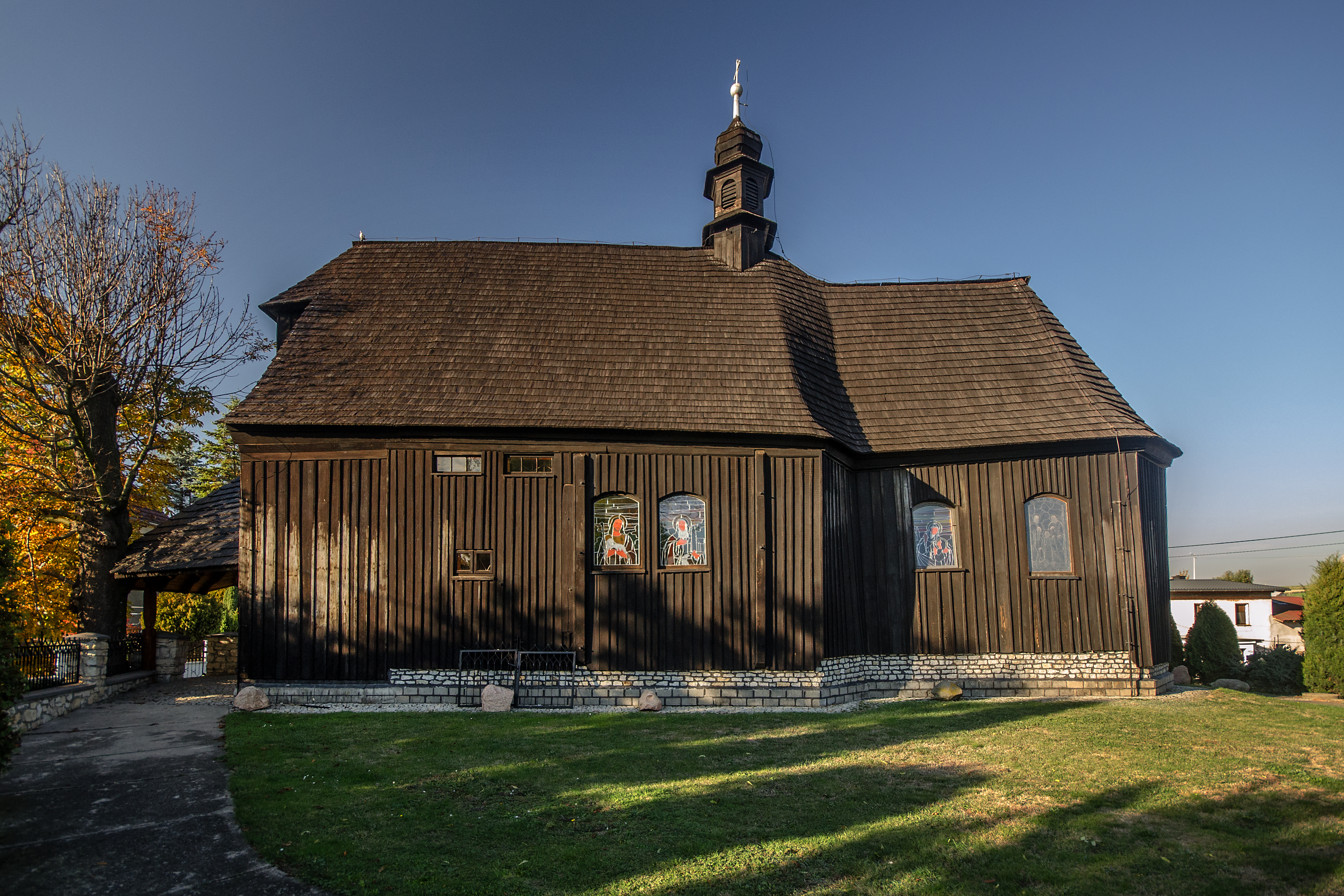
- A wooden church in Zimna Wódka

- Location within Poland
- Coordinates: 50°26′4″N 18°18′57″E
- Country: Poland
- Voivodeship: Opole
- County: Strzelce
- Gmina: Ujazd

Population
  - Total: 720
- Time zone: UTC+1 (CET)
  - Summer (DST): UTC+2 (CEST)
- Vehicle registration: OST

Zimna Wódka ([ˈʑimna ˈvutka], additional name in German: Kaltwasser) is a village in the administrative district of Gmina Ujazd, within Strzelce County, Opole Voivodeship, in southern Poland. The village was mentioned in 1223.

On 15 August 2008, the 2008 Poland tornado outbreak hit Zimna Wódka and damaged 15 buildings.

Its flower carpets during the Corpus Christi procession is along with other villages listed in the Representative List of the Intangible Cultural Heritage of Humanity maintained by UNESCO.
