= Wydzierów =

- Village
- Location within Poland
- Coordinates: 50°22′33″N 18°22′23″E
- Country: Poland
- Voivodeship: Opole
- County: Strzelce
- Gmina: Ujazd

Wydzierów [vɨˈd͡ʑɛruf] (German: Wydzierow) is a village in the administrative district of Gmina Ujazd, within Strzelce County, Opole Voivodeship, in south-western Poland.
