= Olszowa, Opole Voivodeship =

Olszowa Olschowa
- Village
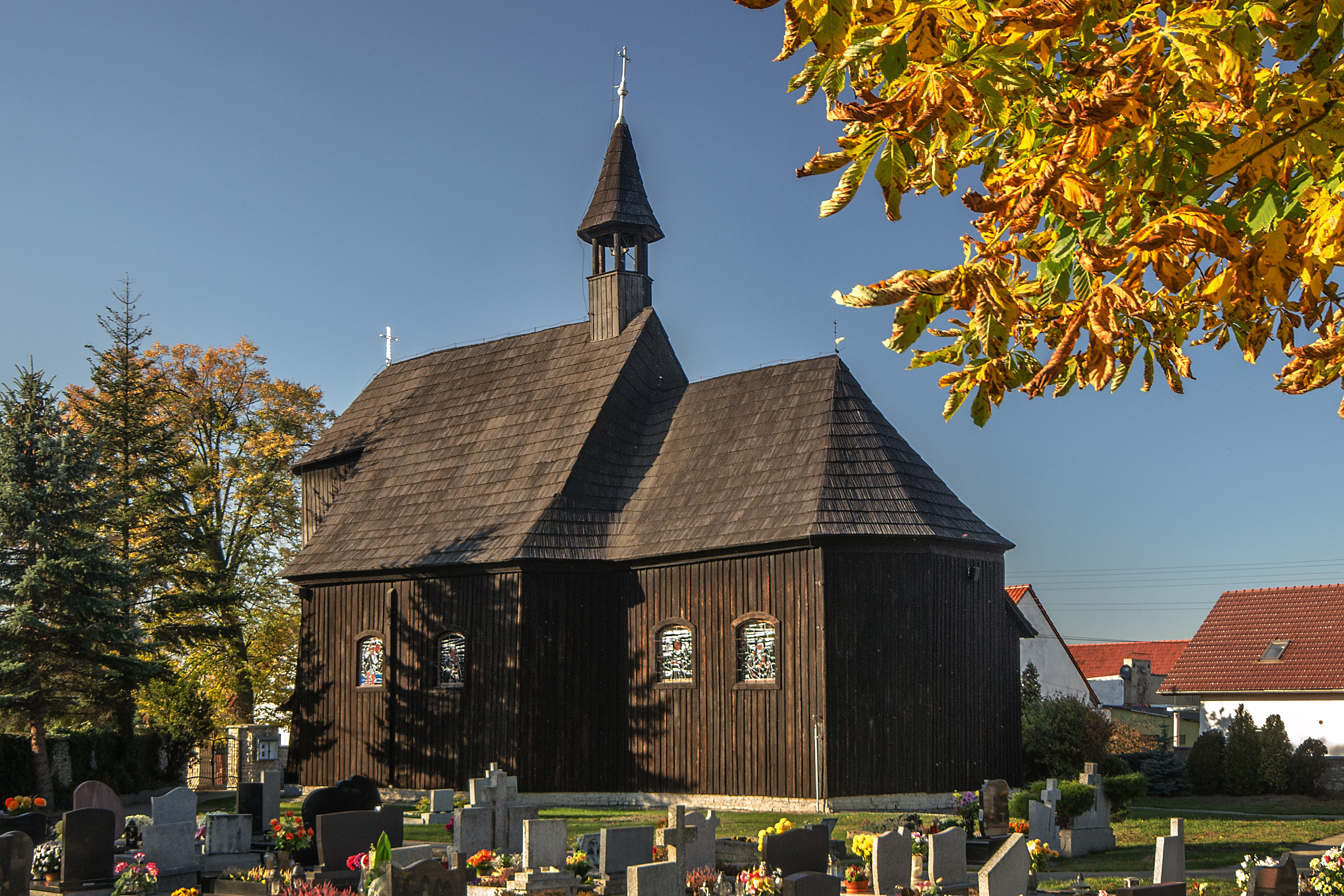
- Catholic church

- Location within Poland
- Coordinates: 50°27′N 18°16′E
- Country: Poland
- Voivodeship: Opole
- County: Strzelce
- Gmina: Ujazd

Population
  - Total: 350
- Time zone: UTC+1 (CET)
  - Summer (DST): UTC+2 (CEST)
- Vehicle registration: OST

Olszowa ([ɔlˈʂɔva], additional name in German: Olschowa) is a village in the administrative district of Gmina Ujazd, within Strzelce County, Opole Voivodeship, in southern Poland. Its flower carpets during the Corpus Christi procession is along with other villages listed in the Representative List of the Intangible Cultural Heritage of Humanity maintained by UNESCO.
