= Kopanina, Opole Voivodeship =

Kopanina
- Village
- Location within Poland
- Coordinates: 50°24′59″N 18°18′23″E
- Country: Poland
- Voivodeship: Opole
- County: Strzelce
- Gmina: Ujazd

Kopanina ([kɔpaˈnina]) is a village in the administrative district of Gmina Ujazd, within Strzelce County, Opole Voivodeship, in south-western Poland.
