= Niezdrowice =

Niezdrowice Niesdrowitz
- Village
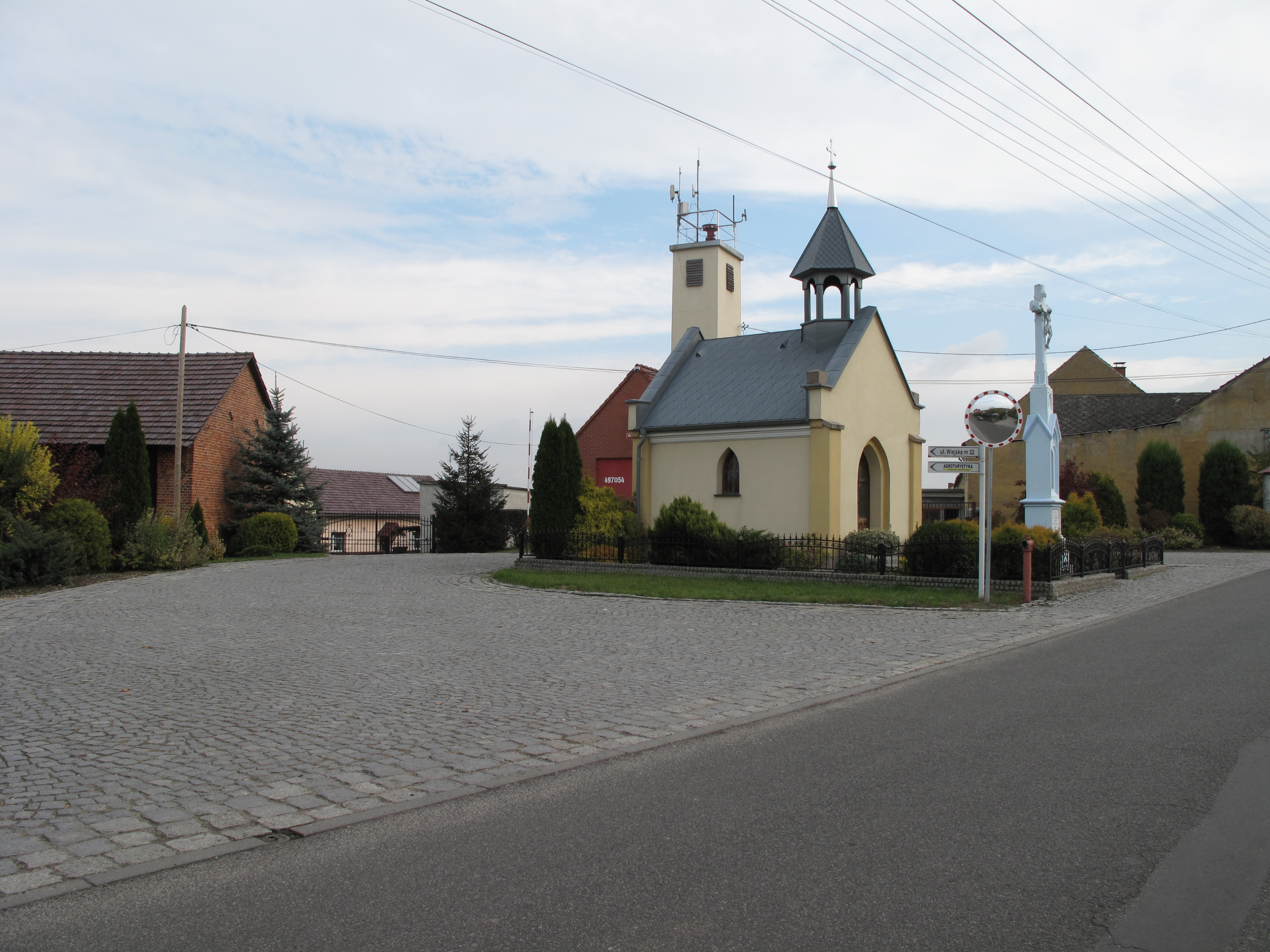
- Village chapel

- Location within Poland
- Coordinates: 50°22′N 18°21′E
- Country: Poland
- Voivodeship: Opole
- County: Strzelce
- Gmina: Ujazd
- Elevation: 197 m (646 ft)
- Population: 605
- Time zone: UTC+1 (CET)
  - Summer (DST): UTC+2 (CEST)
- Vehicle registration: OST

Niezdrowice ([ɲɛzdrɔˈvit͡sɛ], additional name in German: Niesdrowitz) is a village in the administrative district of Gmina Ujazd, within Strzelce County, Opole Voivodeship, in southern Poland.

== History ==
The history of the village dates back to medieval Poland. Its name comes from the Polish words nie zdrowy ("not healthy"). It became later part of Bohemia, Prussia and Germany. In 1936, during a massive Nazi campaign of renaming of placenames, it was renamed Neubrücken to remove traces of Polish origin. In the final stages of World War II, in January 1945, the Germans executed a group of prisoners of the Auschwitz concentration camp in the village. After the war the village became again part of Poland and its original name was restored.

== Gallery ==
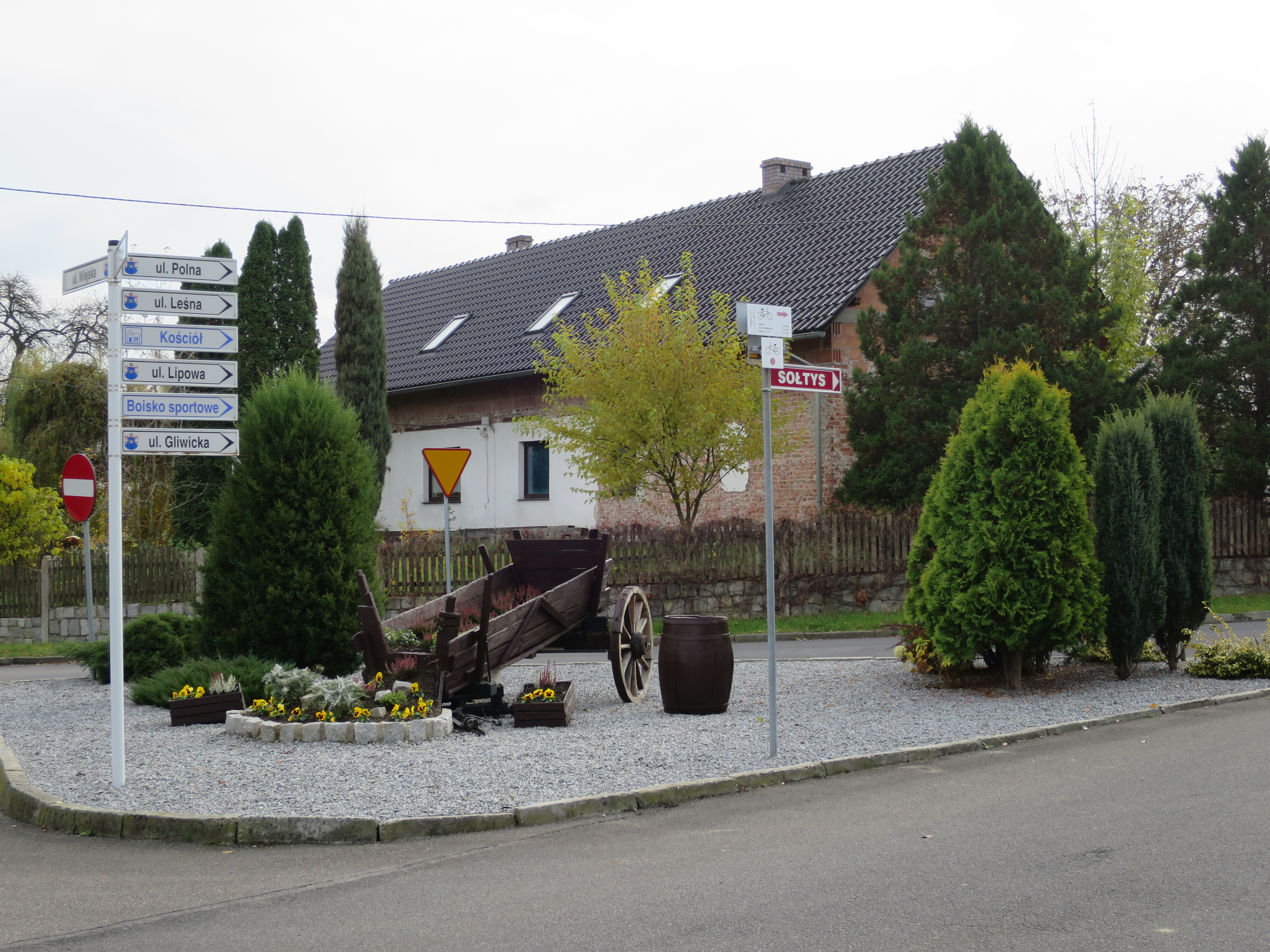
Village centre

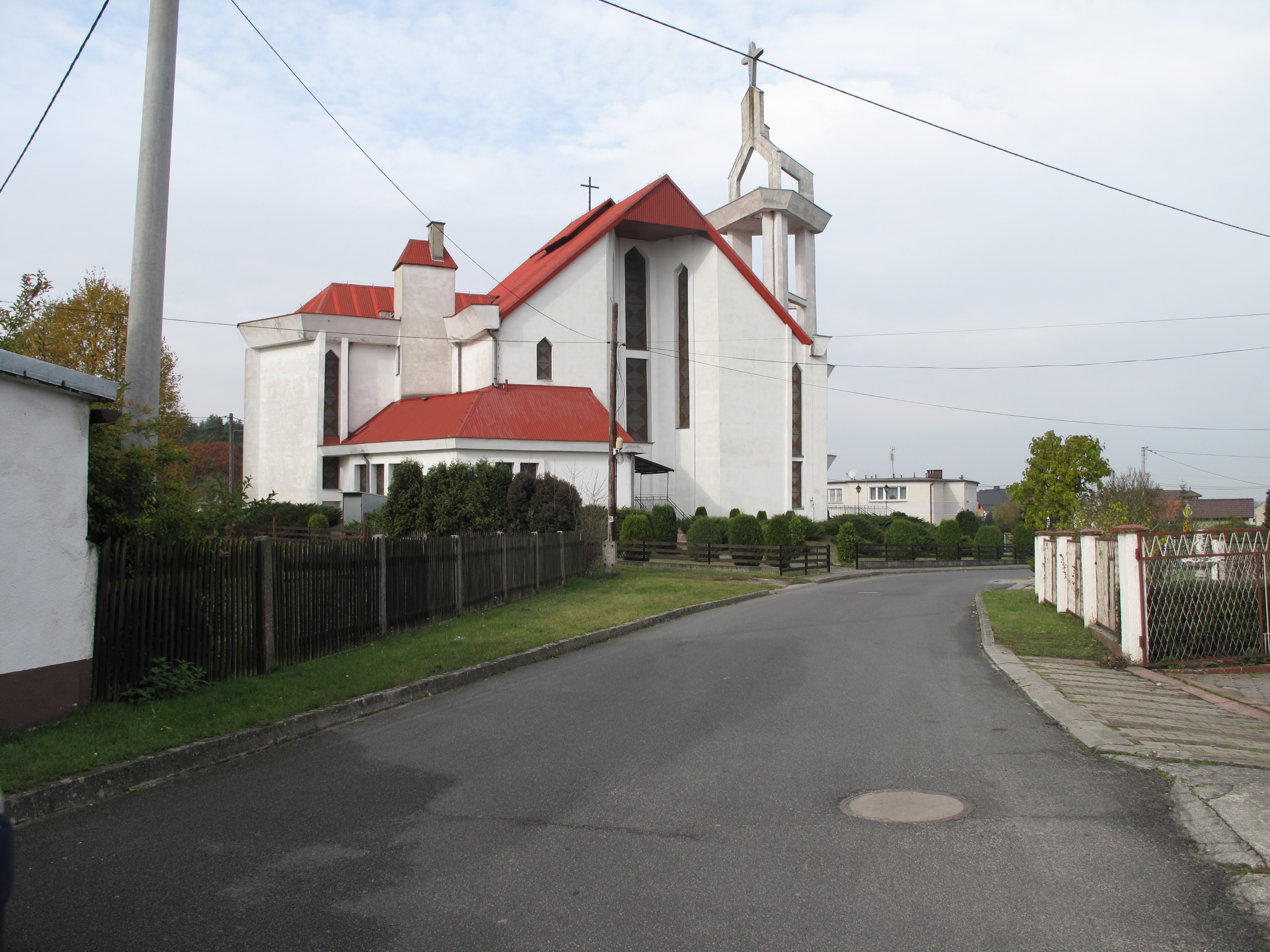
Saint Jadwiga church

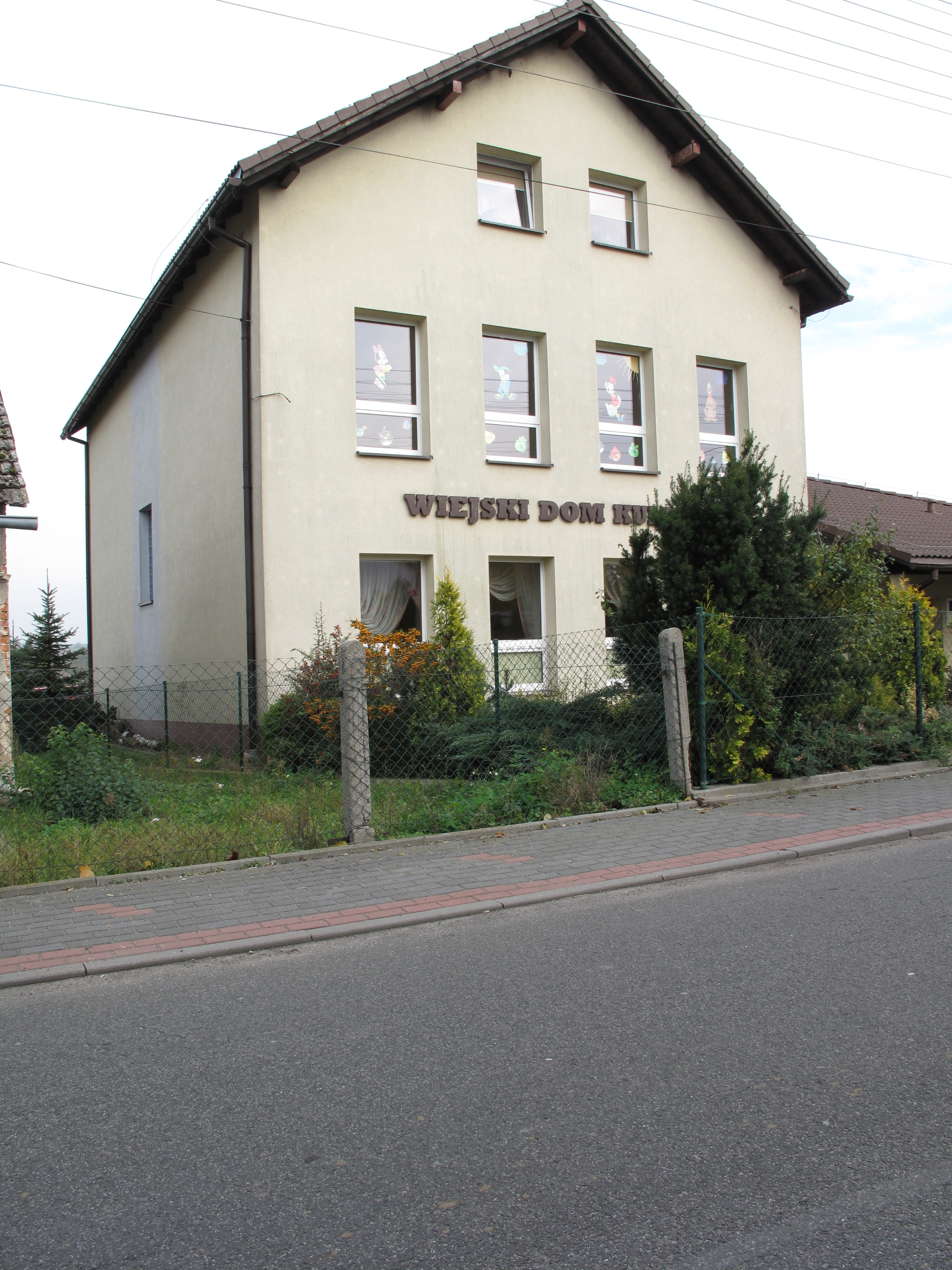
Village House of Culture (Wiejski Dom Kultury)

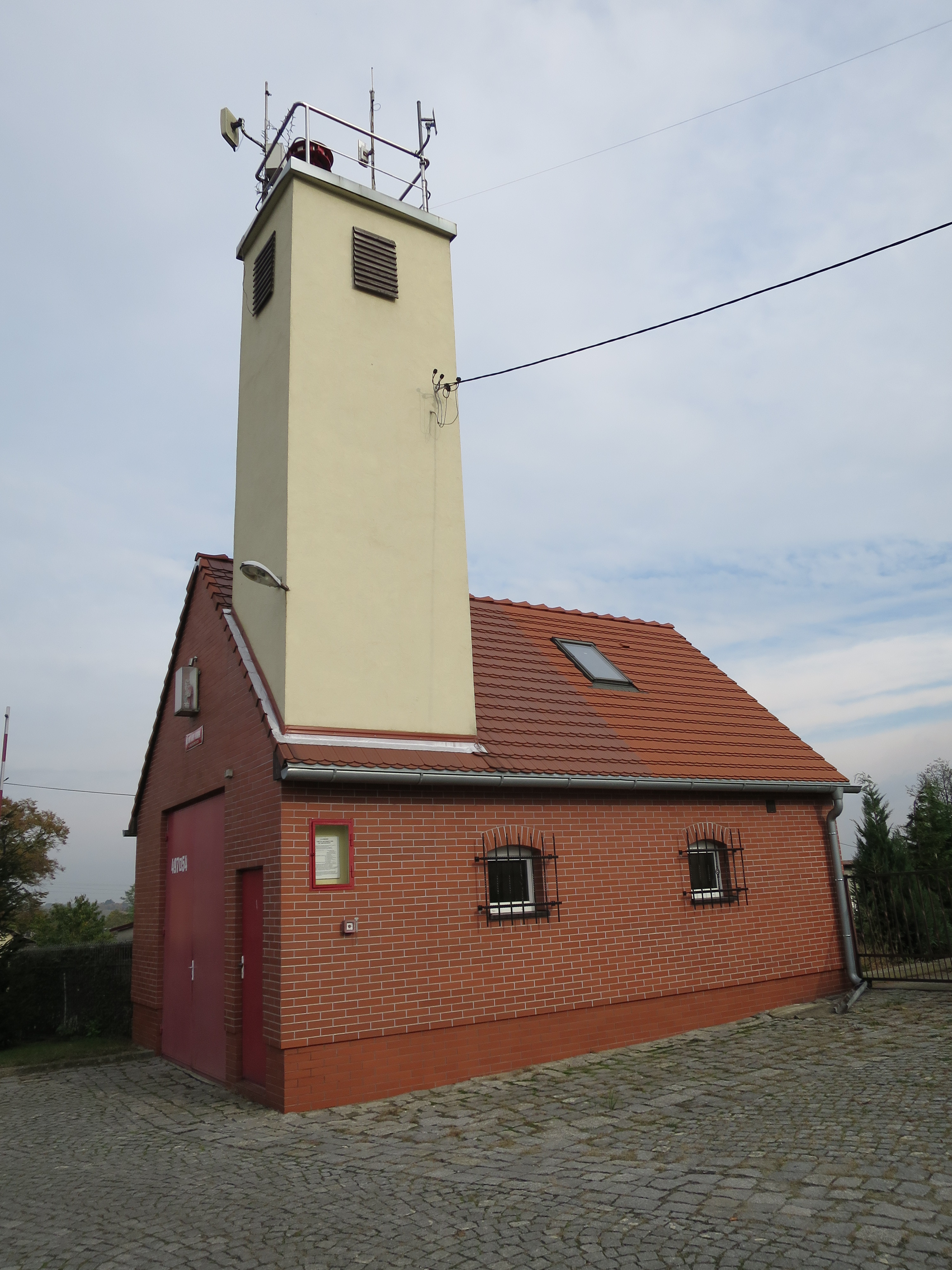
Volunteer fire department
