= Wesołów, Opole Voivodeship =

Wesołów
- Village
- Location within Poland
- Coordinates: 50°26′14″N 18°17′37″E
- Country: Poland
- Voivodeship: Opole
- County: Strzelce
- Gmina: Ujazd

Wesołów [vɛˈsɔwuf] (German: Wessolow) is a village in the administrative district of Gmina Ujazd, within Strzelce County, Opole Voivodeship, in south-western Poland.
