= Komorniki, Strzelce County =

Komorniki
- Village
- Location within Poland
- Coordinates: 50°27′47″N 18°17′58″E
- Country: Poland
- Voivodeship: Opole
- County: Strzelce
- Gmina: Ujazd

Komorniki [kɔmɔrˈniki] (German: Komorniken) is a village in the administrative district of Gmina Ujazd, within Strzelce County, Opole Voivodeship, in south-western Poland.
