= Jaryszów, Opole Voivodeship =

Jaryszów Jarischau
- Village
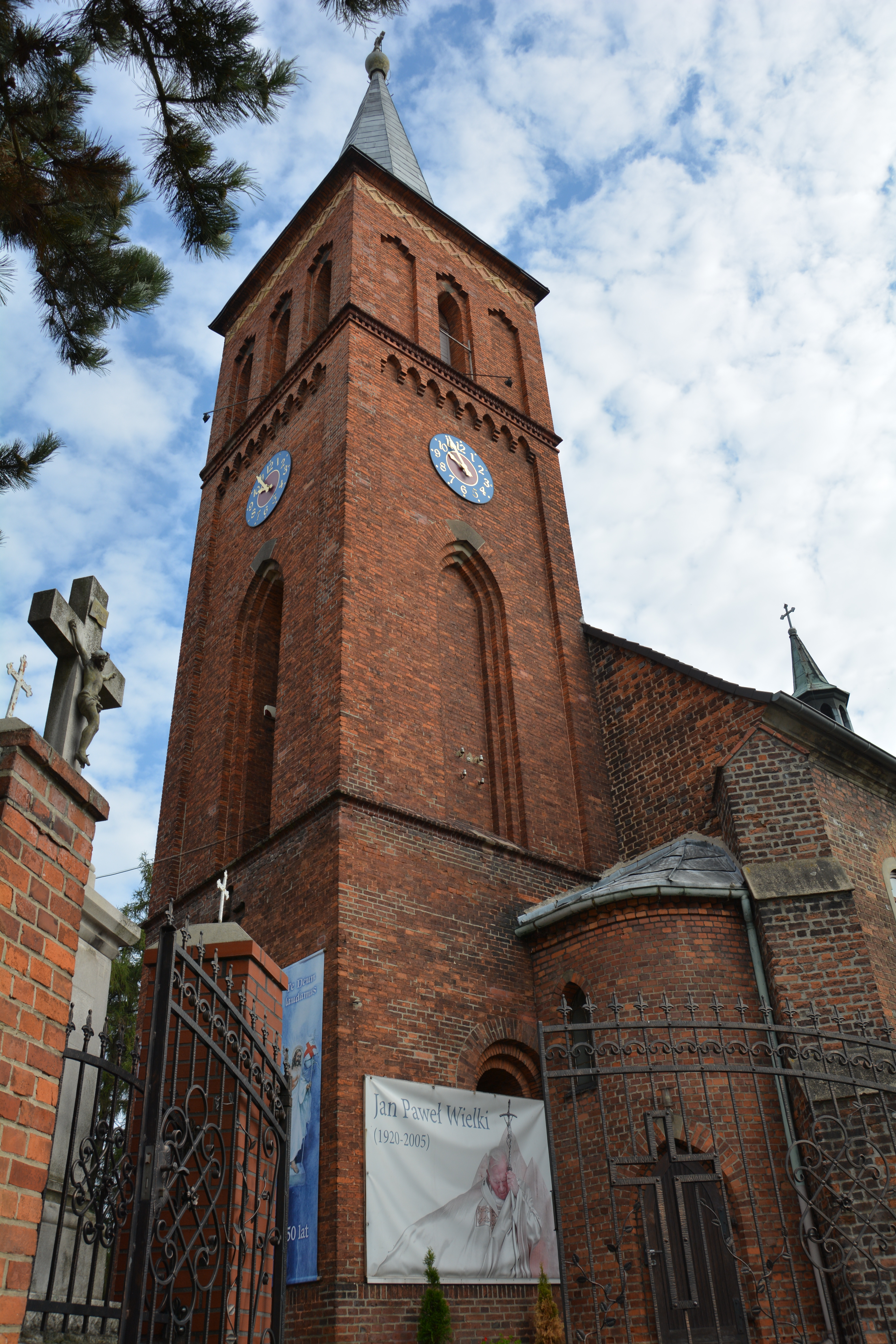
- Church of the Assumption in Jaryszów

- Location within Poland
- Coordinates: 50°25′N 18°21′E
- Country: Poland
- Voivodeship: Opole
- County: Strzelce
- Gmina: Ujazd
- Time zone: UTC+1 (CET)
  - Summer (DST): UTC+2 (CEST)
- Vehicle registration: OST

Jaryszów ([jaˈrɨʂuf], additional name in German: Jarischau) is a village in the administrative district of Gmina Ujazd, within Strzelce County, Opole Voivodeship, in southern Poland.

Jaryszów's landmark is the medieval church of the Assumption.

== History ==
The oldest known mention of Jaryszów dates back to 1265, when it was part of the Piast-ruled fragmented Poland. Its name comes from the Old Polish male name Jaromir, Jarosław or Jarysz. It later became part of Bohemia, Prussia and unified Germany. In the final stages of World War II, in January 1945, the Germans executed a group of prisoners of the Auschwitz concentration camp in the village.
