= Gmina Ujazd, Opole Voivodeship =

Gmina Ujazd Gemeinde Ujest Ujazd Commune
- Gmina
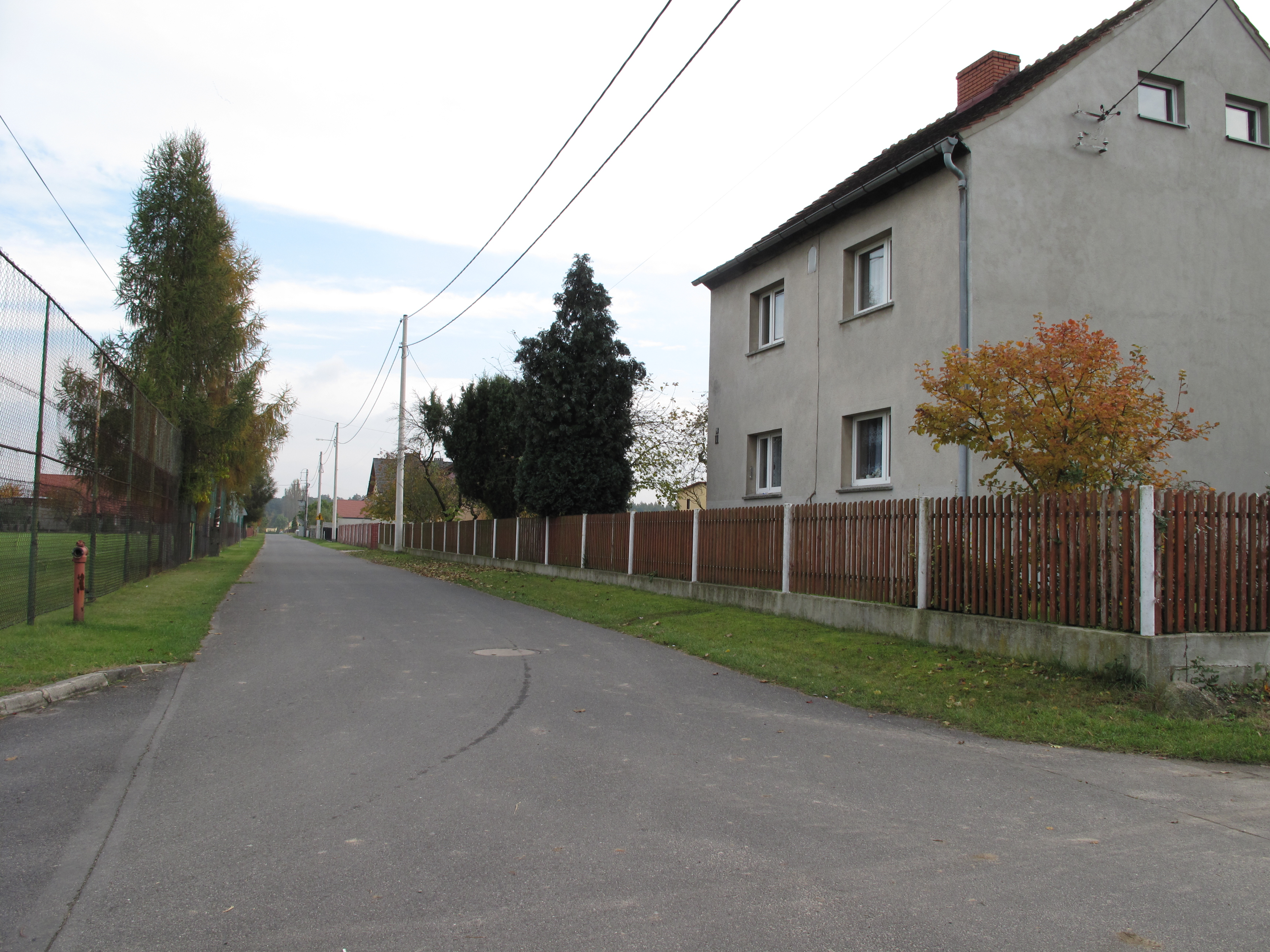
- House in Niezdrowice

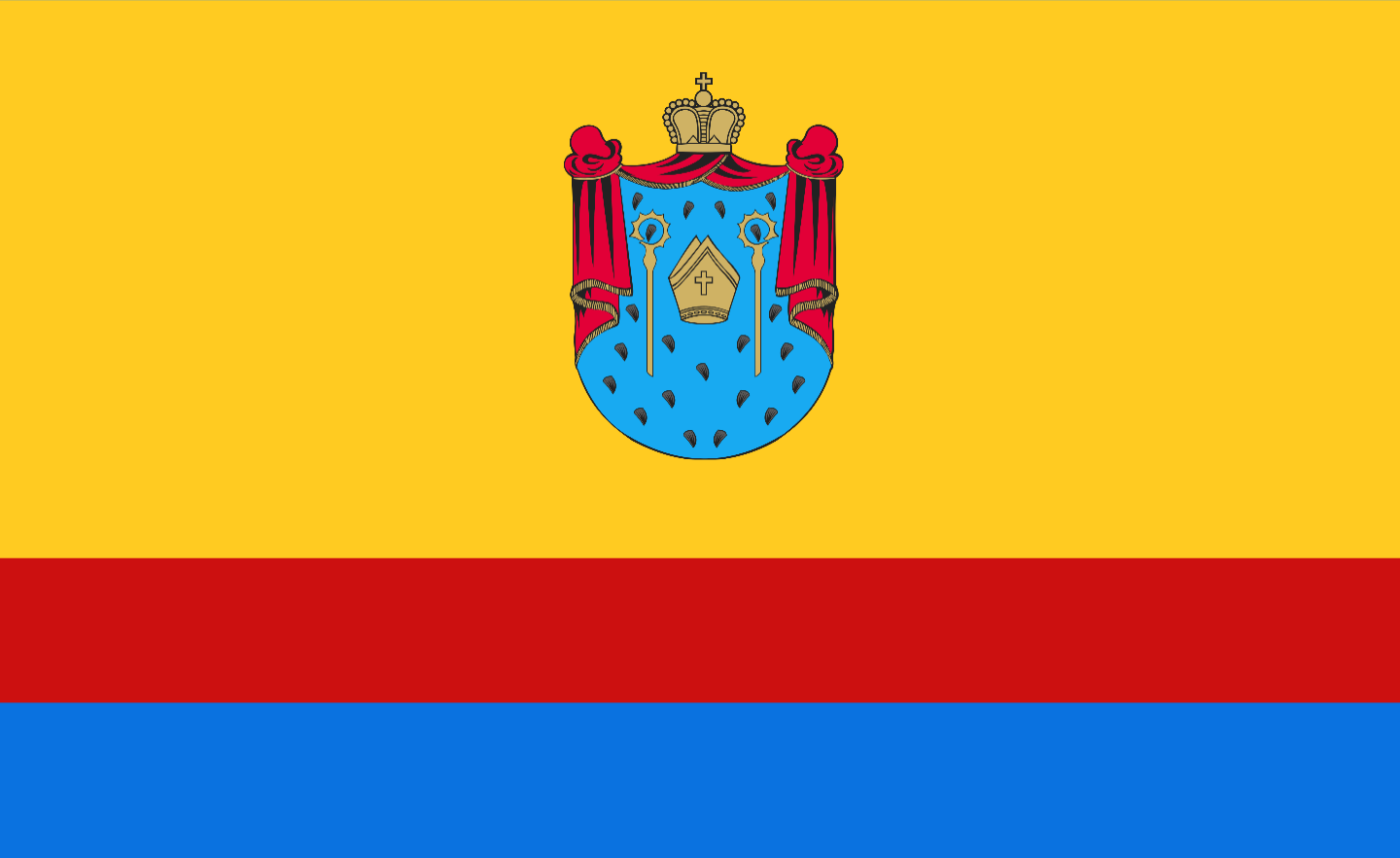
- Flag Coat of arms
- Interactive map of Gmina Ujazd
- Coordinates (Ujazd): 50°23′26″N 18°21′15″E
- Country: Poland
- Voivodeship: Opole
- County: Strzelce
- Seat: Ujazd

Area
  - Total: 83.31 km^{2} (32.17 sq mi)

Population (2019-06-30)
  - Total: 6,418
  - Density: 77.04/km^{2} (199.5/sq mi)
  - Urban: 1,763
  - Rural: 4,655
- Time zone: UTC+1 (CET)
  - Summer (DST): UTC+2 (CEST)
- Vehicle registration: OST
- Website: http://www.ujazd.pl

Gmina Ujazd (German: Gemeinde Ujest) is an urban-rural gmina (administrative district) in Strzelce County, Opole Voivodeship, in south-western Poland. Its seat is the town of Ujazd, which lies approximately 14 kilometres (9 mi) south-east of Strzelce Opolskie and 43 km (27 mi) south-east of the regional capital Opole.

The gmina covers an area of 83.31 square kilometres (32.2 sq mi), and as of 2019, its total population was 6,418. Since 2006, the commune has been officially bilingual in Polish and German, as a sizable German population remained in the area after World War II.

== Villages ==
The commune contains the villages and settlements of:

- Ujazd
- Balcarzowice
- Buczek
- Grzeboszowice
- Jaryszów
- Klucz
- Kolonia Jaryszów
- Komorniki
- Kopanina
- Księży Las
- Niezdrowice
- Nogowczyce
- Olszowa
- Sieroniowice
- Stary Ujazd
- Wesołów
- Wydzierów
- Zimna Wódka

== Neighbouring gminas ==
Gmina Ujazd is bordered by the town of Kędzierzyn-Koźle and by the gminas of Leśnica, Rudziniec, Strzelce Opolskie and Toszek.

== Twin towns – sister cities ==
Gmina Ujazd is twinned with:

- Bad Lobenstein, Germany
- Břidličná, Czech Republic
- Nusplingen, Germany

== Gallery ==
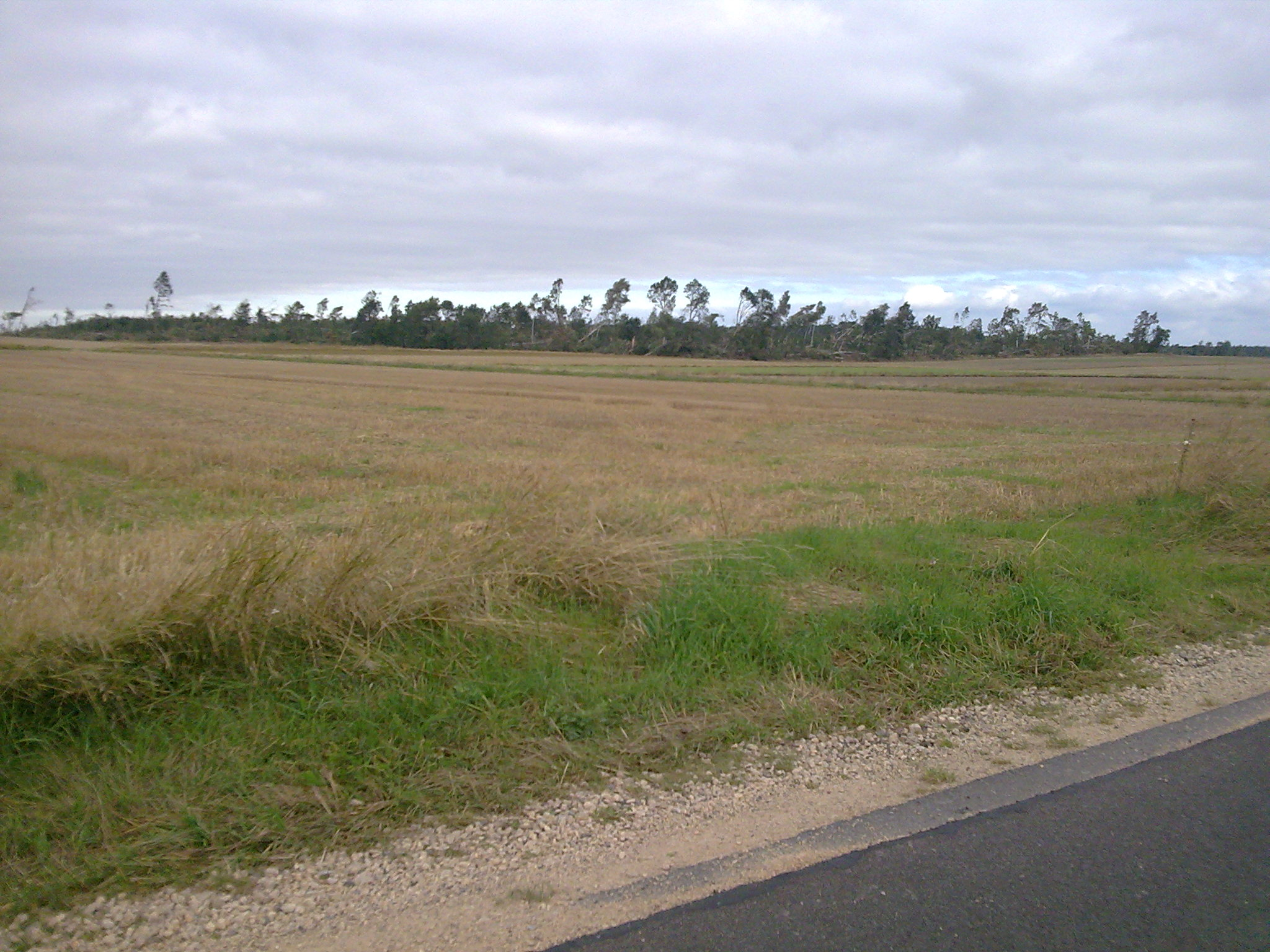
Forest

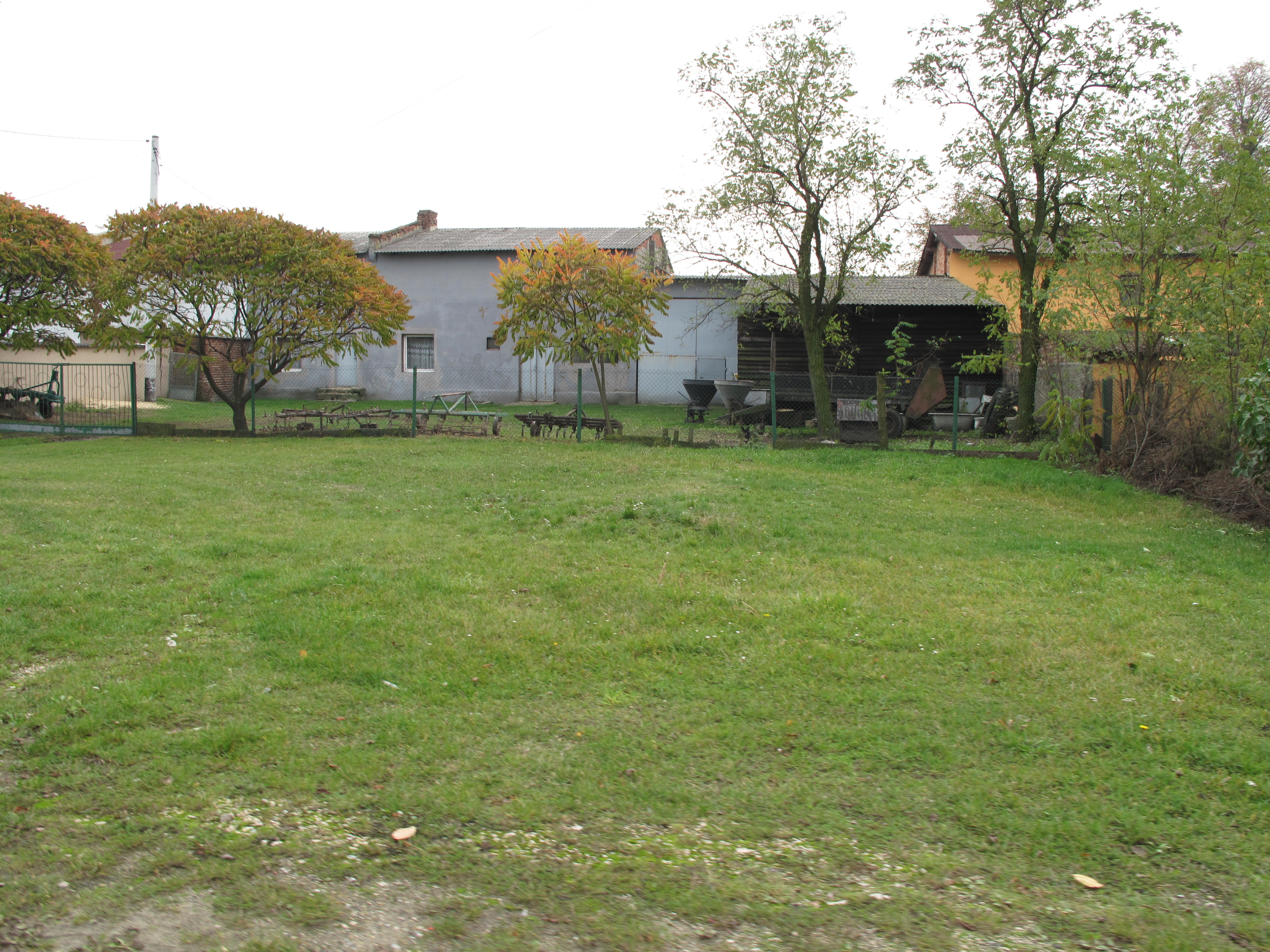
Garden in Grzeboszowice

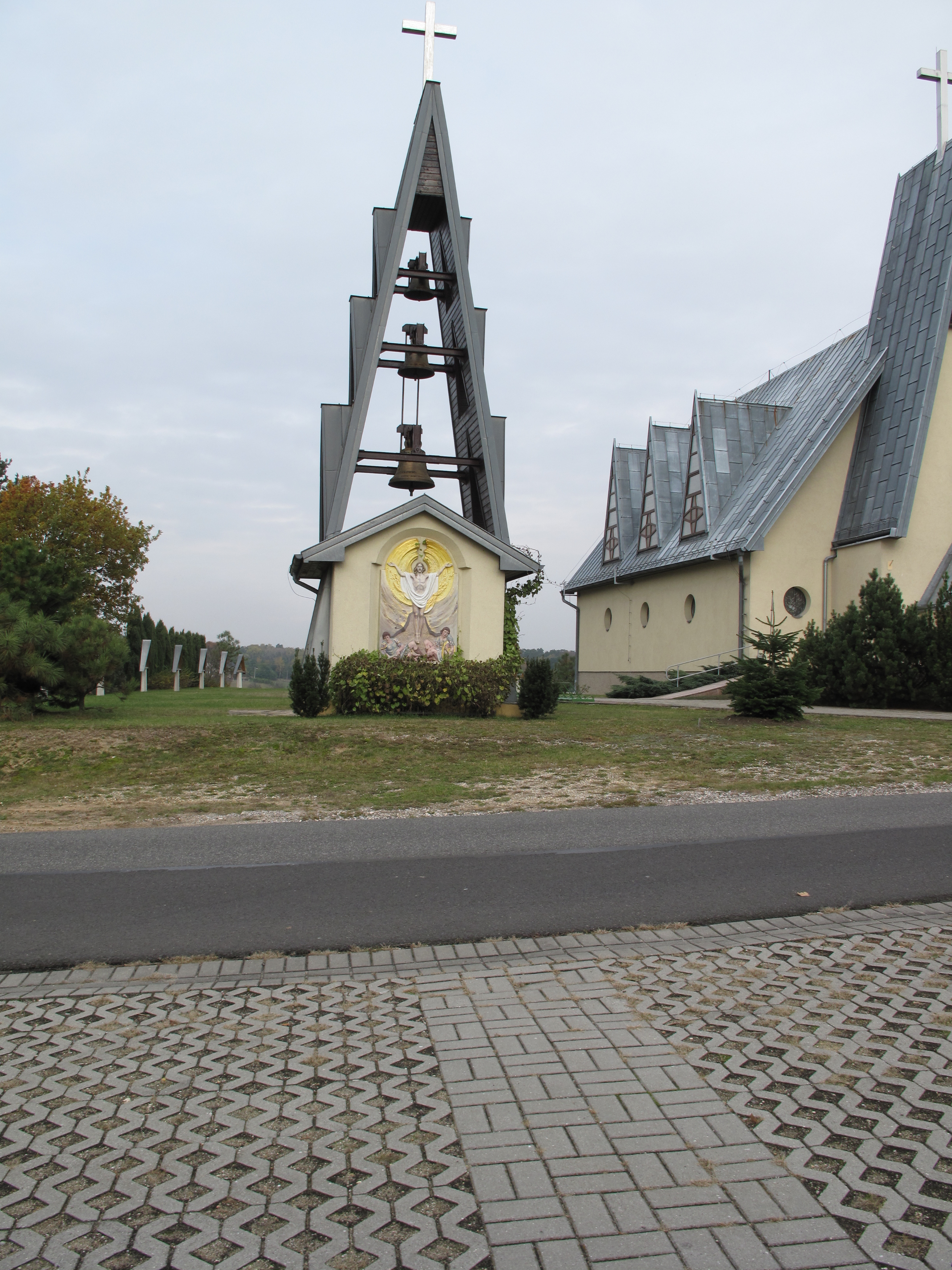
Bell tower in Sieroniowice
