= Buczek (surname) =

Buczek is a Polish surname. Notable people with the surname include:

- Barbara Buczek (1940–1993), Polish composer
- Jakub Buczek (born 1993), Canadian rower
- John Buczek (born 1943/1944), American golfer
- Marian Buczek (born 1953), Polish-born bishop in Ukraine
