= Buczki, Strzelce County =

Buczki
- Village
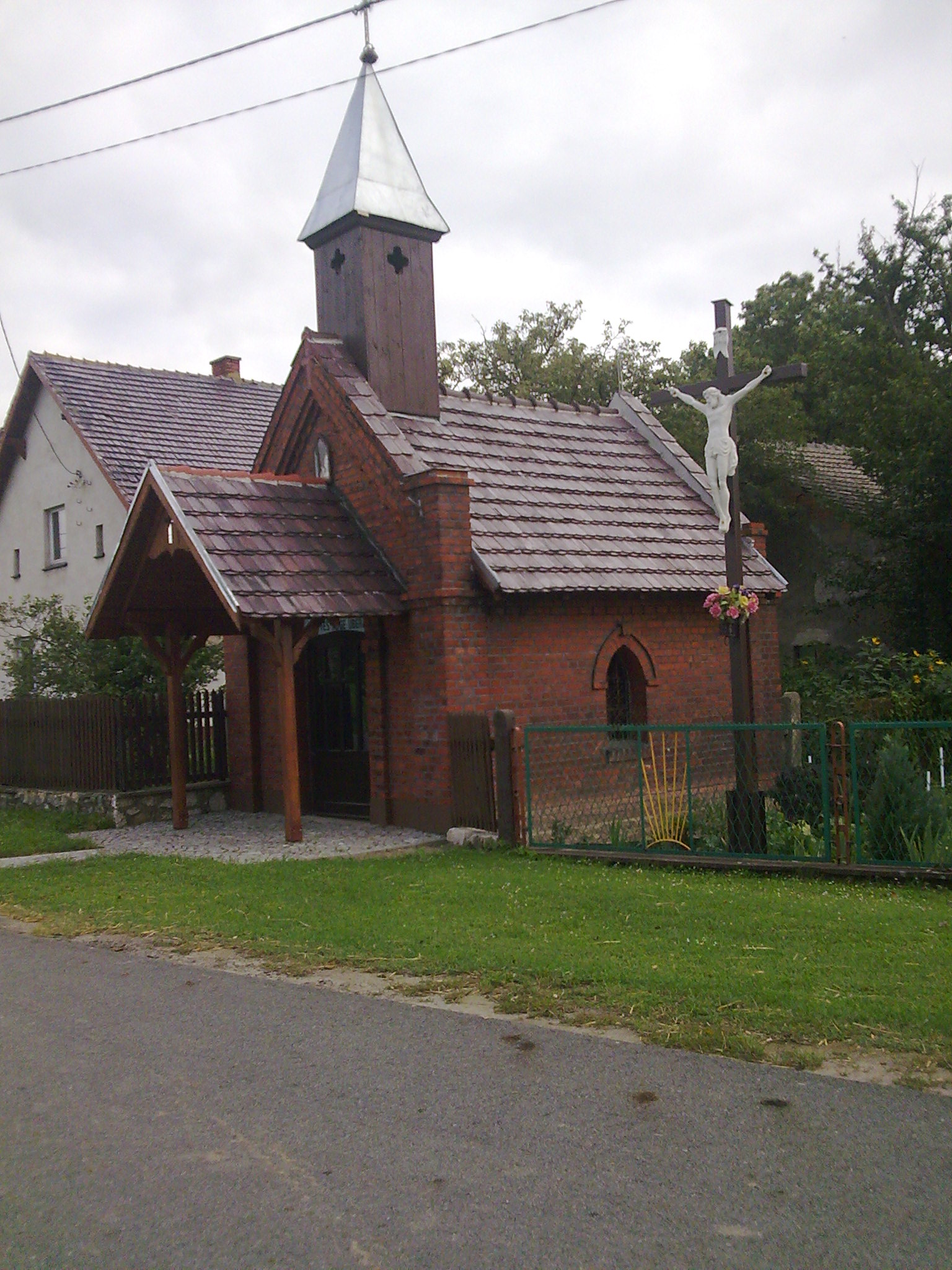
- Chapel

- Location within Poland
- Coordinates: 50°26′40″N 18°19′29″E
- Country: Poland
- Voivodeship: Opole
- County: Strzelce
- Gmina: Ujazd

Buczki [ˈbut͡ʂɛk] (German: Butschek) is a village in the administrative district of Gmina Ujazd, within Strzelce County, Opole Voivodeship, in south-western Poland.
