= List of Intangible Cultural Heritage elements in Eastern Europe =

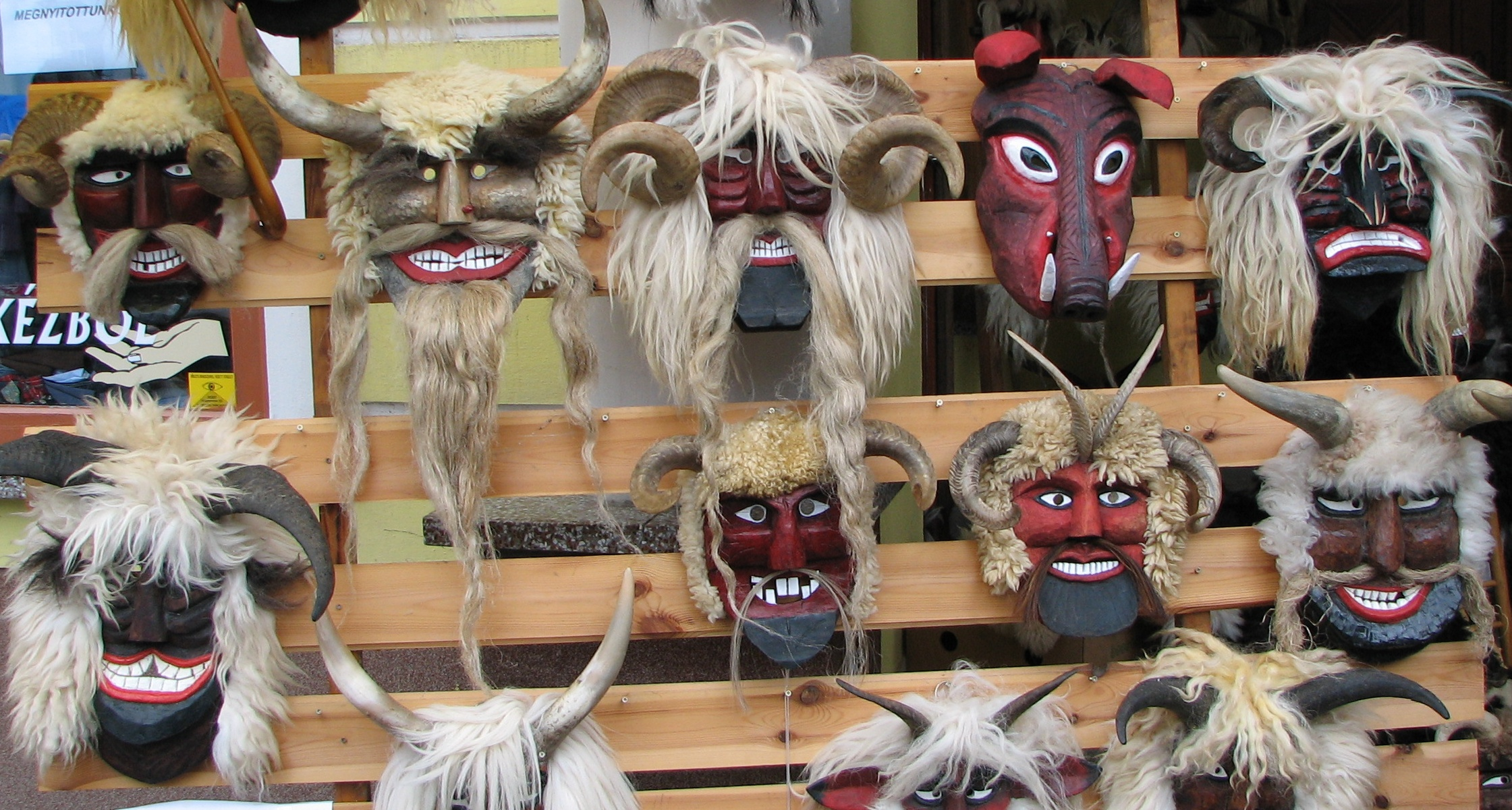
Busó masks in Mohács, Hungary

The United Nations Educational, Scientific and Cultural Organisation (UNESCO) intangible cultural heritage elements are the non-physical traditions and practices performed by a people. As part of a country's cultural heritage, they include celebrations, festivals, performances, oral traditions, music, and the making of handicrafts. The "intangible cultural heritage" is defined by the Convention for the Safeguarding of Intangible Cultural Heritage, drafted in 2003 and took effect in 2006. Inscription of new heritage elements on the UNESCO Intangible Cultural Heritage Lists is determined by the Intergovernmental Committee for the Safeguarding of Intangible Cultural Heritage, an organisation established by the convention.

Eastern Europe, as designated by the United Nations Statistics Division (UNSD), consists of ten countries. The groupings used by the UNSD are not indicative of "any assumption regarding political or other affiliation of countries or territories." All of the countries, with the exception of Russia, are state parties to the Convention for the Safeguarding of Intangible Cultural Heritage. Six intangible cultural heritage elements have been inscribed as elements of Poland, five as elements of the Czech Republic four as elements of Ukraine, two as elements of Bulgaria, Hungary, Romania, and Russia, one for Belarus and Slovakia, and none for Moldova.

== Gallery ==
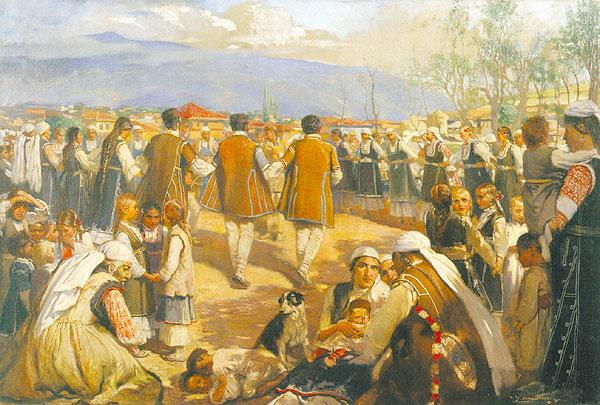
Depiction of a Shop dance in Bulgaria

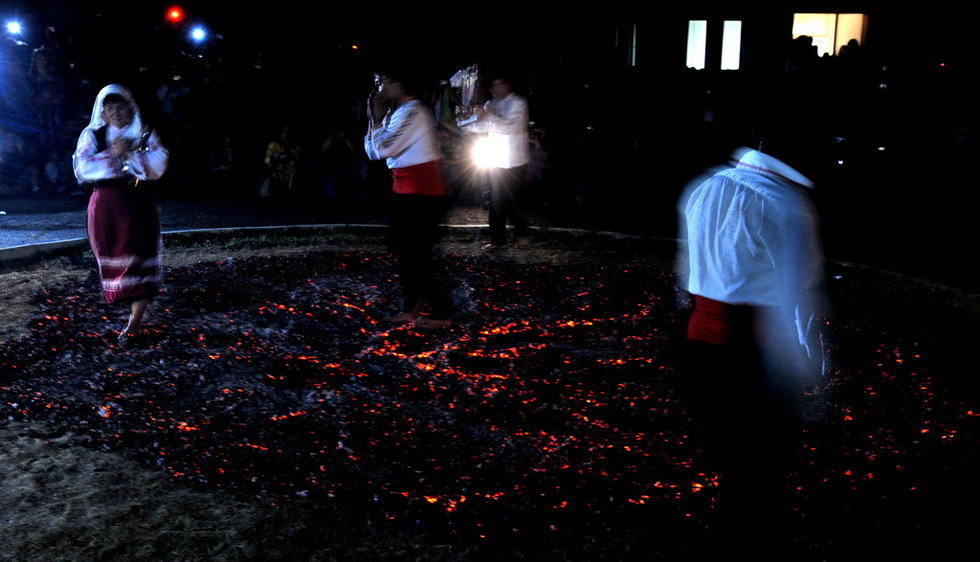
The nestinarstvo fire ritual in Balgari, Bulgaria

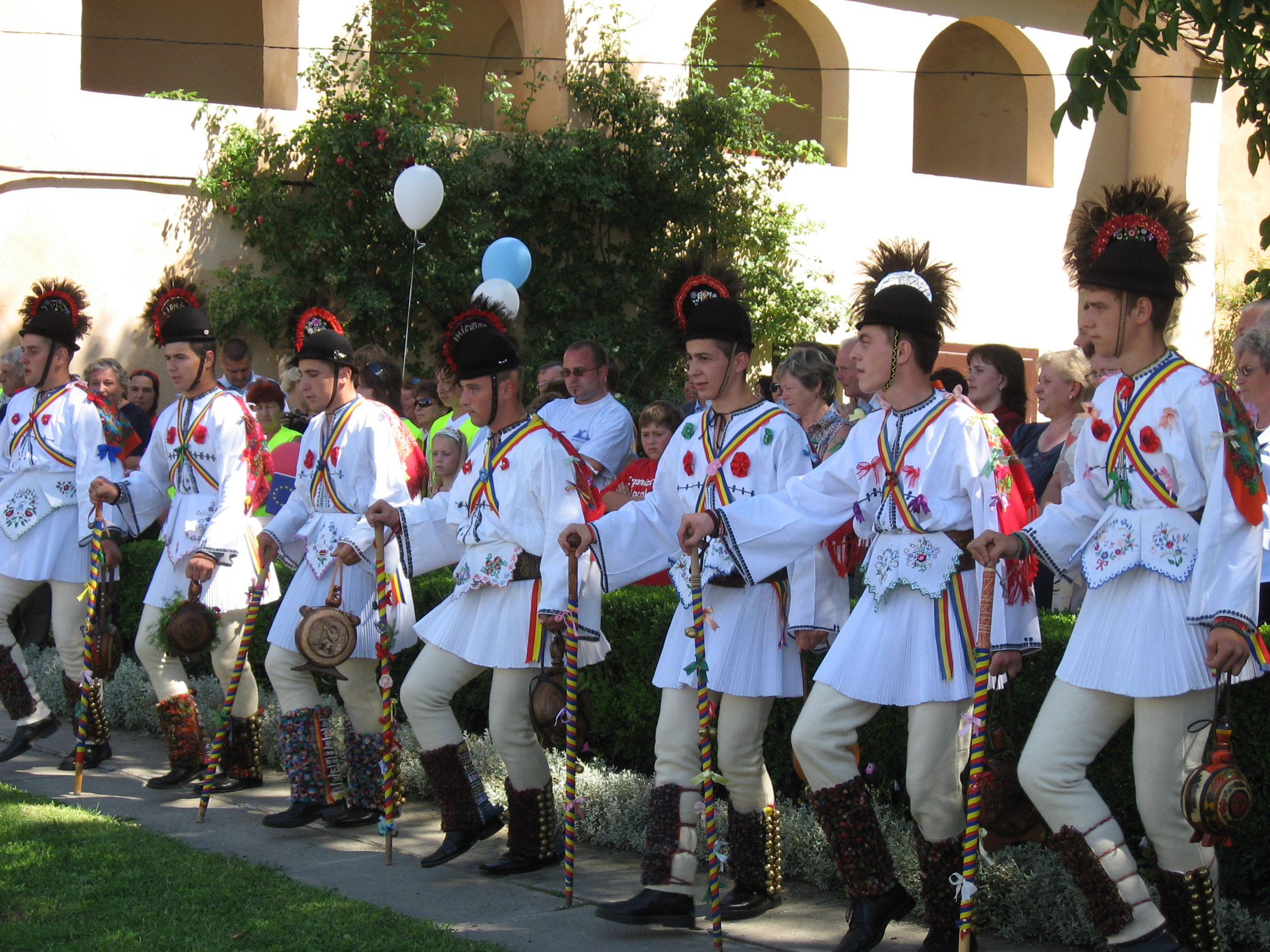
Căluş dancers in Romania.

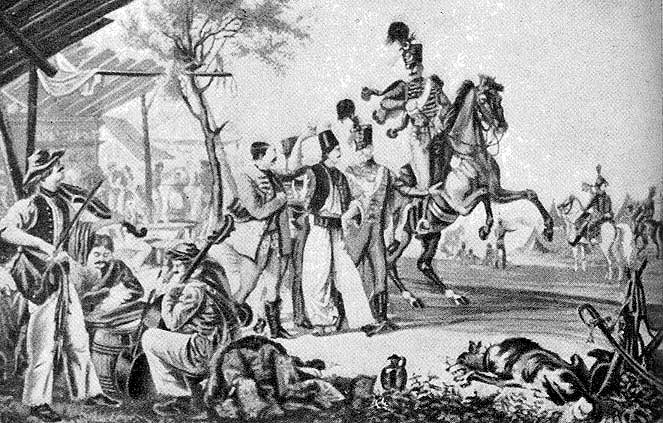
Depiction of a recruit dance, or Verbuňk, in 19th century Hungary

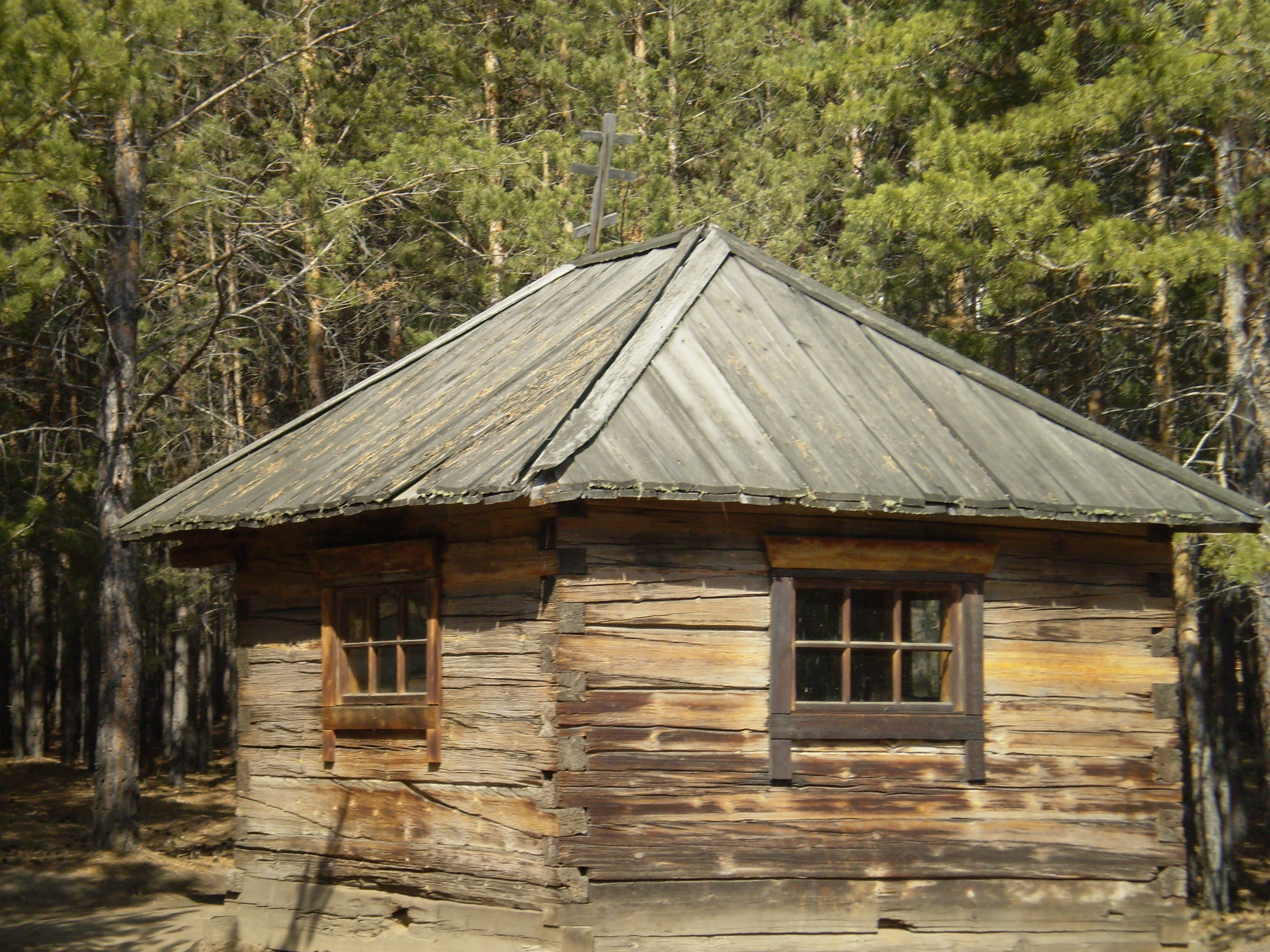
An Old Believers chapel in Siberia, Russia

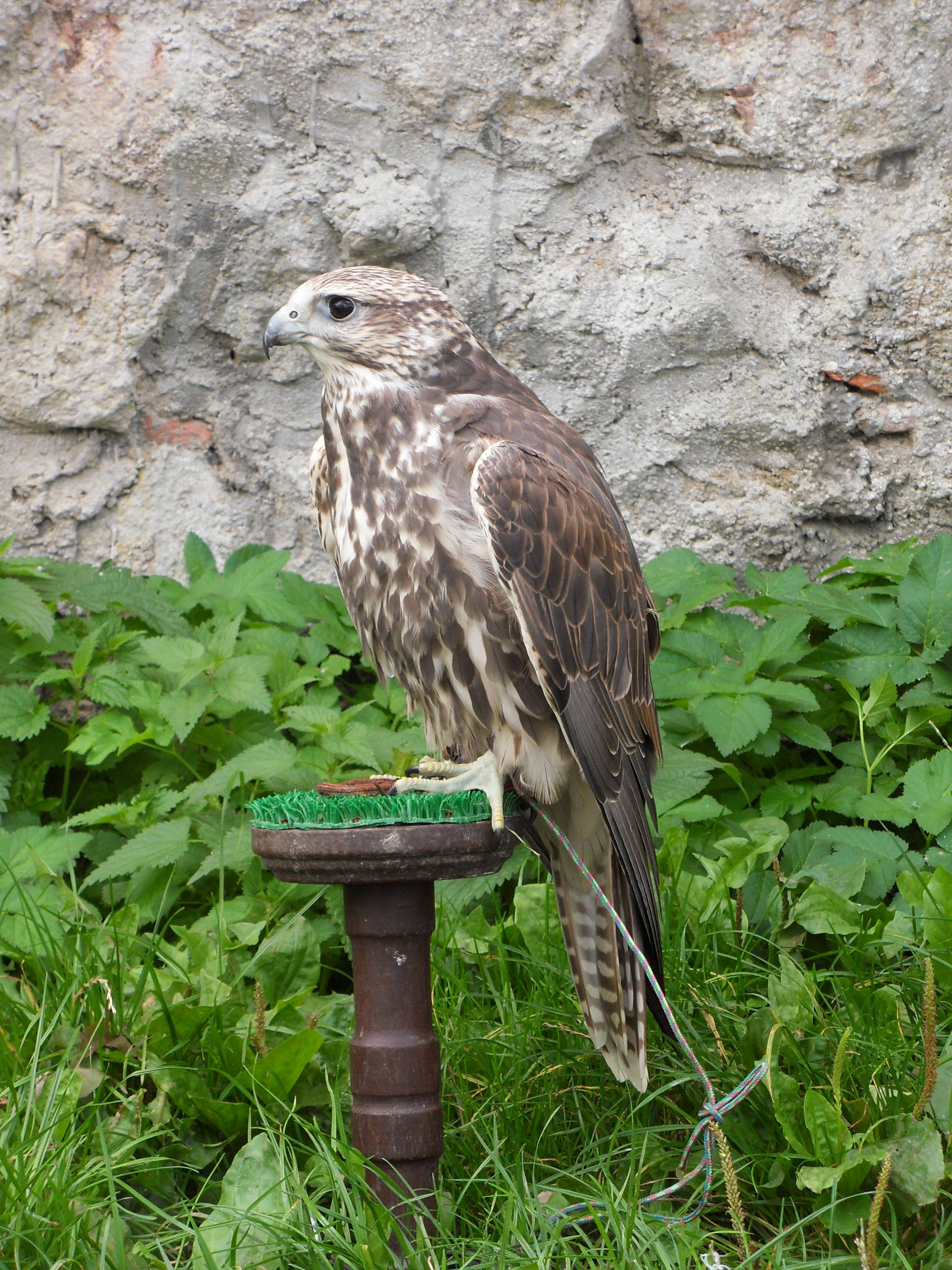
Falconry at Veveří Castle in the Czech Republic

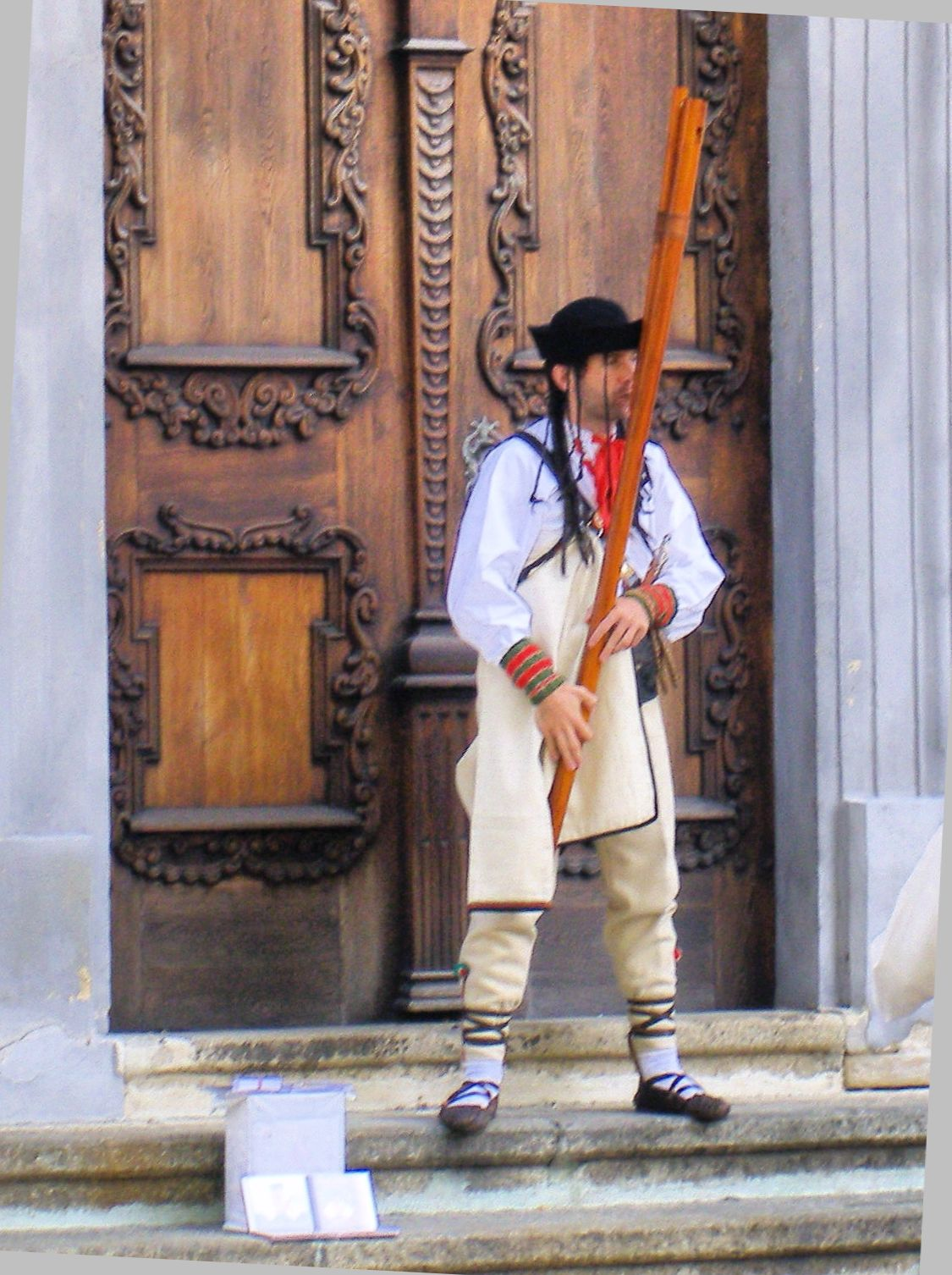
Man playing a fujara in Slovakia

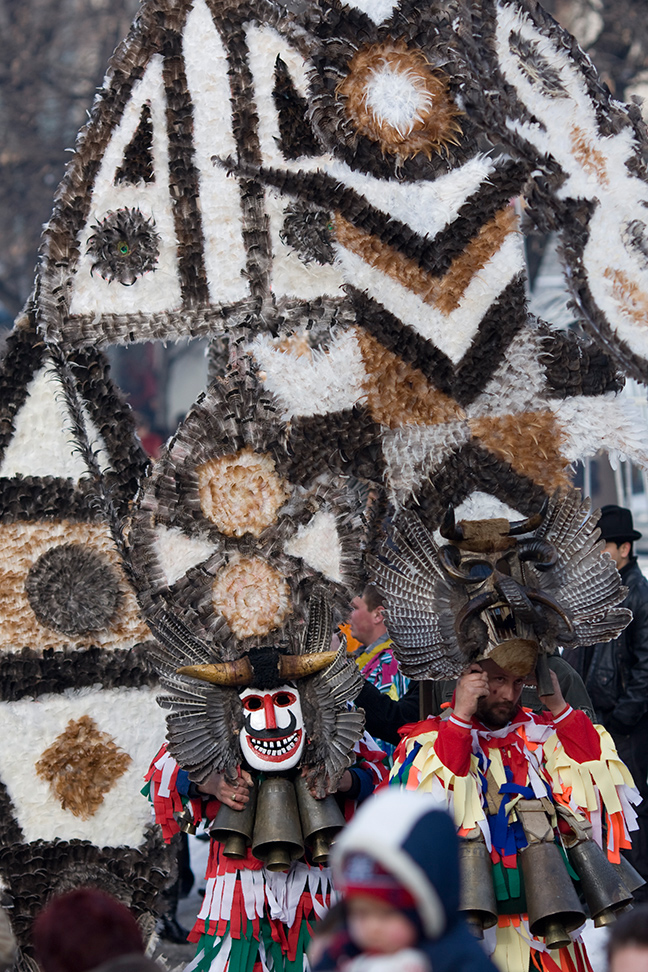
Surva, Masquerade games, Bulgaria

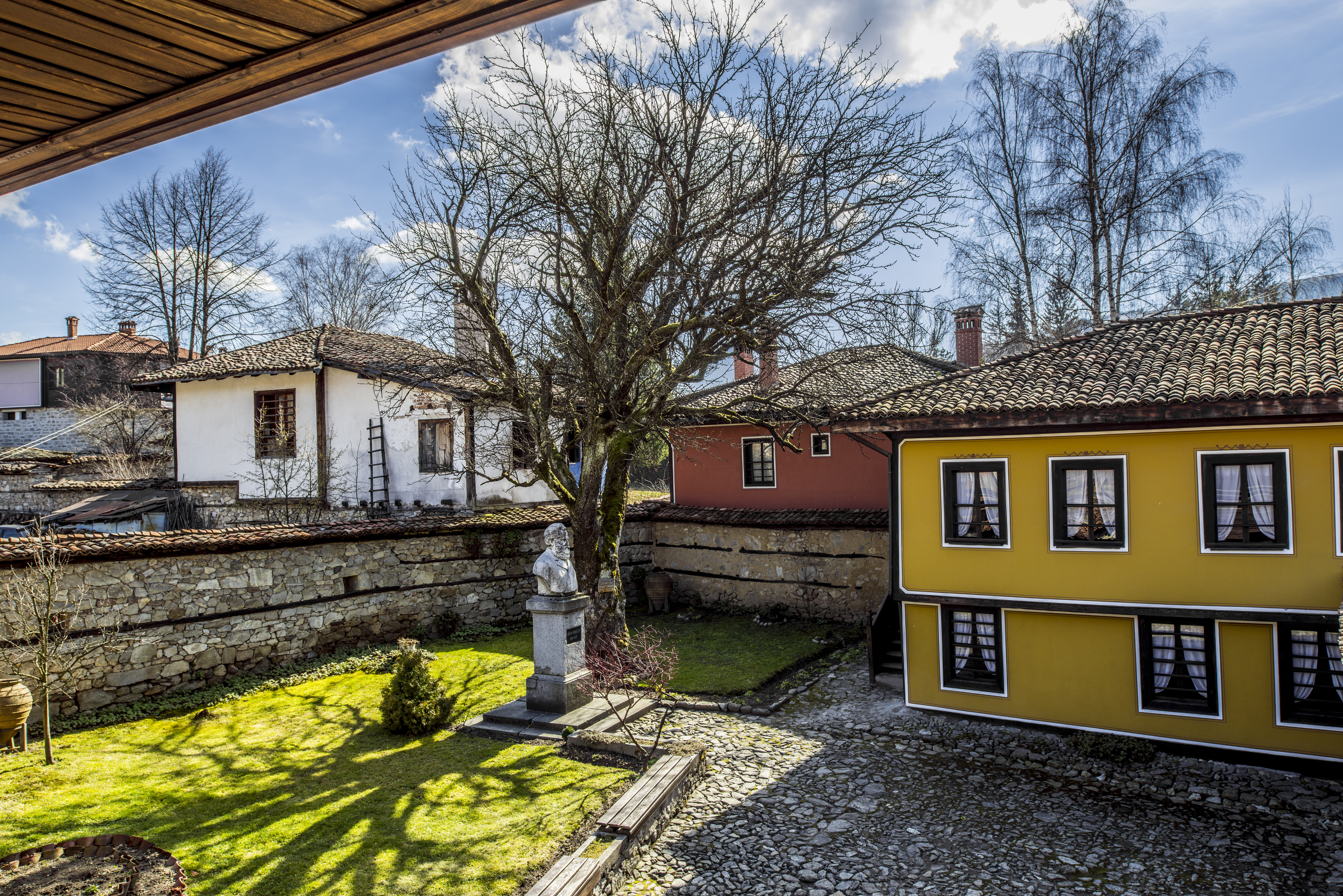
Koprivshtitsa folklore fair, Bulgaria

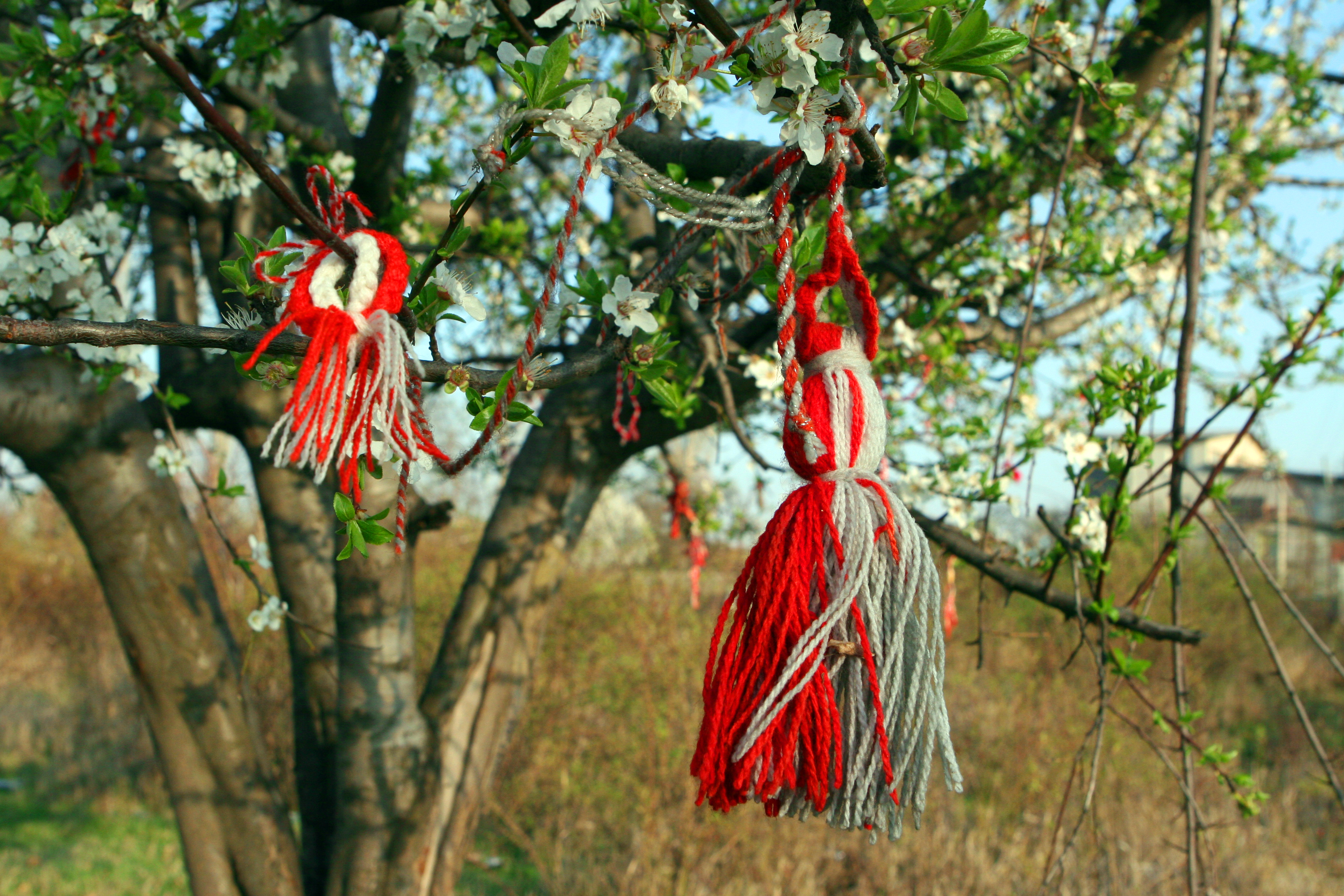
Martenitsa, Bulgaria

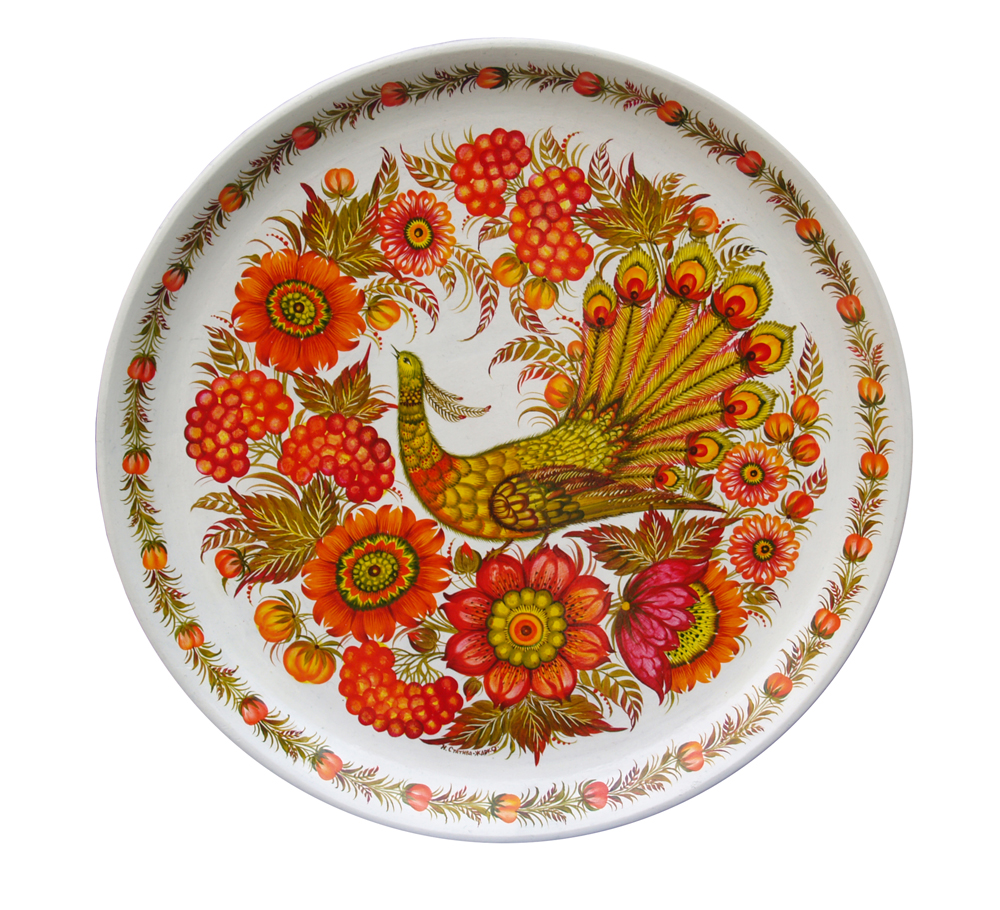
Petrykivka decorative painting, Ukraine

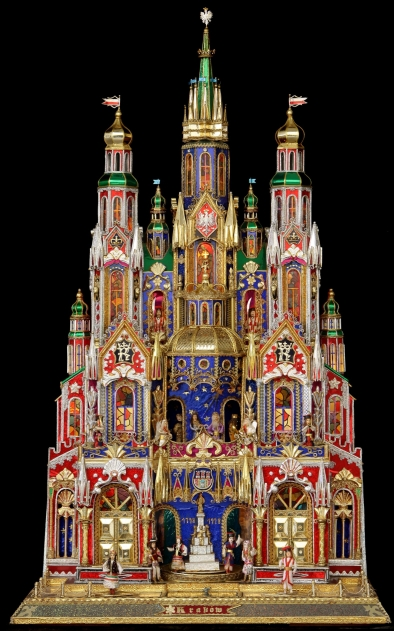
A traditional Kraków szopka nativity scene, Poland

== List of intangible heritage elements ==
Elements of Eastern Europe
Name	Location	Year	Session (Note: The .COM abbreviation is used by UNESCO for committee sessions. For example, 3.COM represents the third session of the committee and 4.COM represents the fourth session. The numbers following the abbreviation, like 14.01, represent the inscription decision number.)	Description	Ref(s)
Rite of the Kalyady Tsars (Christmas Tsars)	Belarus: Village of Semezhava in the Minsk Region	2009	4.COM 14.01	Rite of the Kalyady Tsars is a celebration that occurs during the Belarusian New Year. The event involves the performance of the folk drama Tsar Maximilian, a religious drama about Maximilian, the pagan tsar, and Afolf, his son. Children are chosen to perform as the characters dzad and babam, or old man and old lady. Each year, the celebration draws in around five hundred men, who take part by performing as tsars for families that have unwed daughters. Interest in the event is waning among the youth of the region, leading to concerns by UNESCO that the heritage will be lost.	
Tree beekeeping culture	Belarus and Poland	2020	15.COM	"Tree beekeeping culture includes knowledge, skills, practices, traditions, rituals and beliefs connected to wild bees breeding in tree hives or log hives located in forest areas. Tree beekeepers take care of bees in a special way by trying to recreate the primeval living conditions in tree hives without interfering with the natural life cycle of the bees. Tree beekeepers have no goal of intensifying honey production, which is one of the features that differentiates them from beekeepers. Tree beekeeping therefore requires advanced skills and knowledge of traditional methods and tools."	
Bistritsa Babi, archaic polyphony, dances and rituals from the Shoplouk region	Bulgaria: Shoplouk region, the village of Bistritsa for polyphonic singing	2008	3.COM	Three traditions of the Shopi people of Bulgaria have been inscribed by UNESCO. The first is polyphony, a form of singing that consists of multiple voices combined and sung simultaneously. Participants form a circle and dance as the choir sings. Polyphony is still practiced by the Bistritsa Babi, a term for the old women of the region. The other inscribed elements are lazarouvane, a springtime ritual for girls entering into adulthood, and the horo dance, a form of folk round dance that is performed as a communal dance.	
Nestinarstvo, messages from the past: the Panagyr of Saints Constantine and Helena in the village of Bulgari	Bulgaria: Village of Bulgari in the region of Mount Strandzha	2009	4.COM 13.05	Nestinarstvo is a ritual where participants dance barefoot on embers, similar to fire walking. It is practiced as part of the Panagyr celebration, in honour of the Saints Constantine and Helena. The villagers dance as musicians play bagpipes and drums. The fire dancers, the Nestinari, perform vicariously as they channel the saints. The celebration remains a popular tourist attraction in the village. In the past, the ritual was more widespread, and was practiced in other villages in Bulgaria and nearby Greece.	
Falconry, a living human heritage	Czech Republic (Note: Falconry was inscribed as a heritage of Austria, Belgium, Croatia, Czechia, France, Germany, Hungary, Ireland, Italy, Kazakhstan, Kyrgyzstan, Mongolia, Morocco, Netherlands, Pakistan, Poland, Portugal, Qatar, Saudi Arabia, Slovakia, South Korea, Spain, Syria, and the United Arab Emirates.)	2010	5.COM 6.45	Falconry involves the use of trained birds of prey for hunting. It is also practiced recreationally, as a sport. Falconry is widespread around the world, and is seen in a diverse range of cultures. UNESCO has inscribed falconry as a shared intangible heritage element of eleven countries, including the Czech Republic.	
Ride of the Kings in the south-east of the Czech Republic	Czech Republic: Villages of Vlčno and Skoronice and towns of Kunovice and Hluk in the southeastern region of the Czech Republic	2011	6.COM 13.13	The Ride of the Kings takes place during the Pentecost celebration, a festivity in honour of the Holy Spirit. According to tradition, the ride commemorates Saint Wenceslaus as he, wearing a disguise, makes his escape. Lasting two days, the participants of the Ride parade on horses adorned with decorations. Central to the Ride is the King, a role performed by a boy in women's clothing, ten to twelve years old, blindfolded with ribbons and holding a rose with his teeth.	
Shrovetide door-to-door processions and masks in the villages of the Hlinecko area	Czech Republic: Town of Hlinsko and the surrounding region, known as Hlinecko, in Eastern Bohemia	2010	6.COM 6.11	Shrovetide festivities occur before Lent, and were restricted in the past by the Communist government and the Catholic Church. Participants of the carnival celebrate by wearing colourful masks. Traveling in a parade, they visit the homes of villagers to dance for them. A mare is treated as a scapegoat and given a mock execution in a ritual involving dancing and alcohol.	
Slovácko Verbuňk, recruit dances	Czech Republic: South Moravia and Zlín regions	2008	3.COM	Slovácko Verbuňk is a folk dance. Originating in the 18th century, the dance was traditionally performed by young men drafted as Austrian army recruits. The dance was both celebratory and a symbol of dissent. Practiced by recruits, it was named verbŭnk, based on the German word for recruitment, werbung. The men dance, performing one of many regional variations, as musicians play songs known as New Hungarian.	
Handmade production of Christmas tree decorations from blown glass beads	Czech Republic: Poniklá and the Giant Mountains area	2020	15.COM	Handmade production of Christmas tree decorations from blown glass beads refers to handmade Christmas tree decorations that are produced by blowing a heated glass tube inserted in a brass mould shaped into a string of beads called klaustschata and silvered, coloured and hand decorated. The string of beads is then cut into shorter or individual beads, which are threaded onto wires, thus forming ornaments of many forms. Considered as a key cultural element of the Giant and Jizera Mountains regions in North Bohemia, where blown glass beads have been produced since the late eighteenth century, the traditional craft is specialized and technically demanding.	
Busó festivities at Mohács: masked end-of-winter carnival custom	Hungary: Town of Mohács in the southern region of Hungary, near the Danube river	2009	4.COM 13.42	Busójárás is a six-day-long festival that occurs in honour of the arrival of spring, and is of Croatian origin. Participants dress up in costumes and wear masks, sailing through the Danube river before parading through the city. This is done, based on traditional accounts, to commemorate the chasing away of Turks during the Ottoman rule of Hungary. Other events include feasting, costume competitions, displays of carved masks, and playing instruments.	
Táncház method: a Hungarian model for the transmission of intangible cultural heritage	Hungary	2011	6.COM 9.8	Táncház is a Hungarian folk dance. UNESCO has inscribed the methods in which the dance is taught. Knowledge of the dance is passed down from older generations, and personal innovation and wide participation are encouraged. Táncház, which means "dance house," is derived from Transylvanian customs. The popularity of the dance grew in the 1970s, as part of a wider renewal of folk traditions.	
Nativity scene tradition	Poland: City of Kraków	2018	13.COM	"The Nativity Scene (szopka) tradition in Krakow is a social practice originating from Christmas celebration customs, centred around constructing cribs. Born in the nineteenth century, the tradition is indissolubly connected to the City of Krakow and based on skills and knowledge passed down for generations."	
Falconry, a living human heritage	Poland	2021	16.COM	"Falconry is the traditional art and practice of training and flying falcons (and sometimes eagles, hawks, buzzards and other birds of prey). It has been practised for over 4000 years. The practice of falconry in early and medieval periods of history is documented in many parts of the world. Originally a means of obtaining food, falconry has acquired other values over time and has been integrated into communities as a social and recreational practice and as a way of connecting with nature."	
Flower carpets tradition for Corpus Christi processions	Poland: Towns of Spycimierz, Klucz, Olszowa, Zalesie Śląskie and Zimna Wódka	2021	16.COM	"The tradition of arranging flower carpets is inherently linked to the feast of Corpus Christi in Poland. For the feast, which typically involves a mass followed by a joyful procession from the church to the streets, families in several villages use flowers to arrange colourful and symbolic carpets on the route of the procession, usually on the road section in front of their homes. The flower carpets cover the road running from the church through the village and can reach almost two kilometres in length. The flowers used are picked from the surrounding fields or from family gardens."	
Timber rafting	Poland	2022	17. COM	"Timber rafting in Austria, Czech Republic, Germany, Latvia, Poland and Spain originated in the Middle Ages, when rafts were used to transport wood, goods and people using natural water flows. In the past, rafters traveling to remote destinations spent weeks living and working together on their raft. As a result, a community sharing the knowledge, skills, techniques and values of making and navigating timber rafts emerged. The tradition has been cultivated for generations and remains strong thanks to continuous oral communication, observation and participation, including through youth camps, local schools, festivals and workshops."	
Polonaise, traditional Polish dance	Poland	2023	18.COM	"The polonaise is a joyful Polish group dance, which can be enacted by a few to even several hundreds of pairs marching in procession, following a trajectory proposed by the first pair. As it is widely present in Polish culture, general awareness of the dance and its social meanings are increased by literature, music and film. A form of joint celebration, the polonaise commemorates important moments in family and community life and symbolizes cooperation, reconciliation and equality."	
Căluş ritual	Romania: Olt County of southern Romania and regions in Bulgaria and Serbia inhabited by Vlachs	2008	3.COM	The Căluşari, a fraternal group, perform an annual group dance, the Căluş, as a ritual. The dance may have origins as a fertility rite, and a 17th-century written account is the earliest attestation of its performance. The participants carry wooden stick and wear a costume covered with bells, and dance while the musicians play with the accordion and the violin. Special hats and a bearded mask are also worn.	
Doina	Romania	2009	4.COM 13.69	Doina is a form of Romanian folk music, characterized by a free meter and heavy ornamentation. Songs in the style explore various themes, and are performed individually, sometimes with an instrument. The different regional types of doina are diverse, each with distinct characteristics and known by a different local name.	
Cultural space and oral culture of the Semeiskie	Russia: Transbaikal region, east or "beyond" Lake Baikal, in Siberia	2008	3.COM	The Semeiskie migrated to Transbaikal region because of religious persecution. They are Old Believers, a religious group that split from the Russian Orthodox Church in the 17th century during the raskol schism. UNESCO inscribed the community's "cultural space," located east of Lake Baikal, and the group's tradition of musical performances. Until the 20th century, the Semeiskie lived isolated, separated from the surrounding population.	
Olonkho, Yakut heroic epos	Russia: Sakha Republic in the Russian Far East region	2008	3.COM	The olonkho is an epic performed by the Yakuts consisting of ten to fifteen thousand verses. It describes the cosmological beliefs of the Yakuts, including a creation myth, and the gods and legends of the region's indigenous religion. Modern events and themes are also integrated into the performance. The epic is transmitted within the family, and is used as a form of educational recreation.	
Fujara and its music	Slovakia: Central Slovakia	2008	3.COM	The fujara is a shepherd's flute originating from central Slovakia. The instrument is long, and consists of a mouthpiece and three tone holes on the main tube. The flutes are made of wood from elder trees or maple trees. In the 19th and 20th centuries, the popularity of the flute spread beyond shepherds. It is still performed during celebrations and by folk music groups.	
Petrykivka decorative painting as a phenomenon of the Ukrainian ornamental folk art	Ukraine: Village of Petrykivka, Dnipropetrovsk Oblast	2013	8.COM		
Cossack’s songs of Dnipropetrovsk Region	Ukraine: Dnipropetrovsk Oblast	2016	11.COM		
Tradition of Kosiv painted ceramics	Ukraine: City of Kosiv, Ivano-Frankivsk Oblast	2019	14.COM		
Ornek, Crimean Tartar design elements	Ukraine: Crimea	2021	16.COM		

== See also ==
- List of World Heritage Sites in Eastern Europe
