= Bistritsa Babi =

Bulgarian folk women's choir

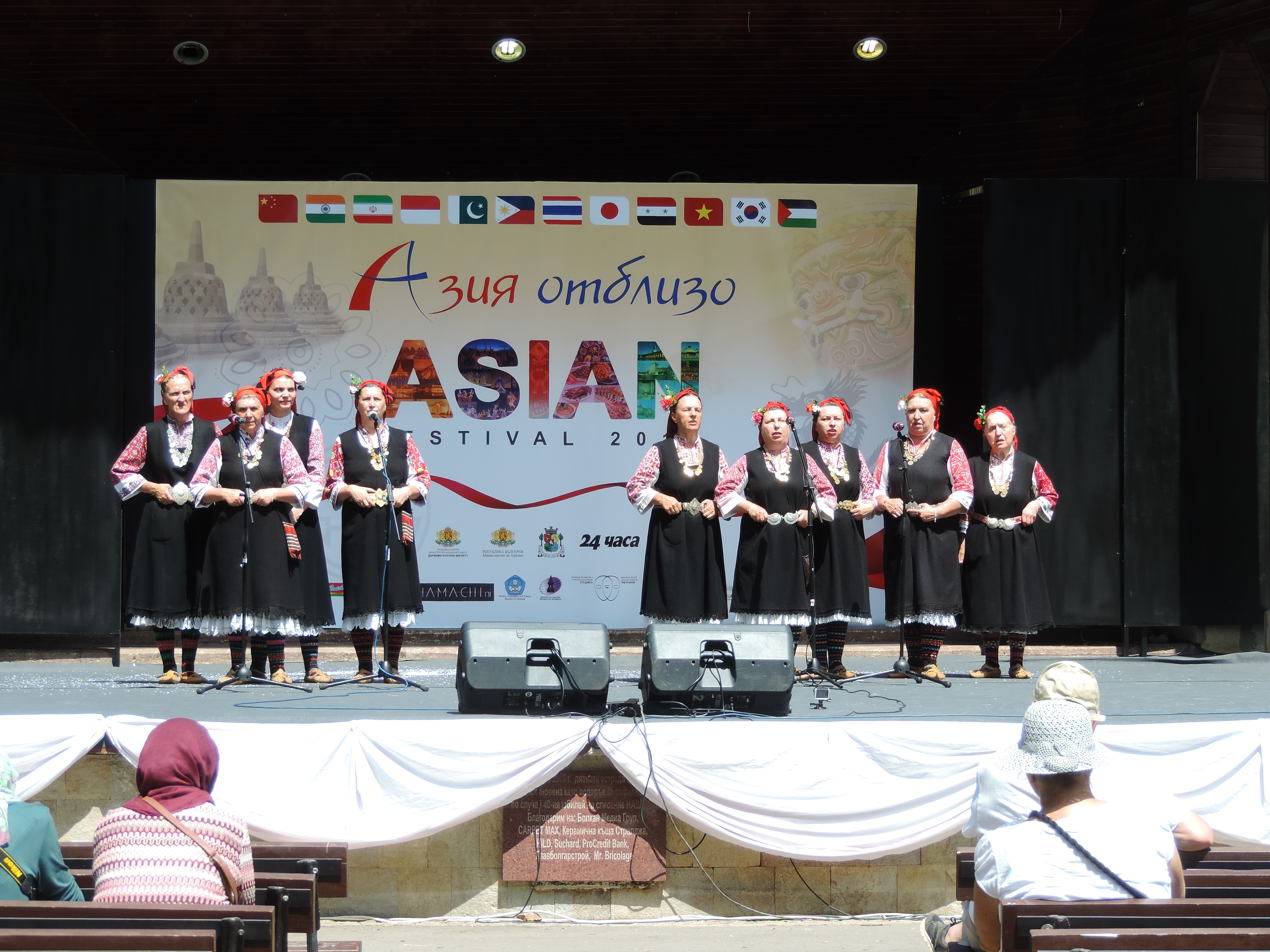
Asian Festival 2017 in Sofia, Bulgaria 21

Bistritsa Babi (Bulgarian: Бистришките баби, "The Bistritsa Grannies") are an elderly/multi-generational women's choir carrying on the traditional dances and polyphonic singing of the Shopluk region of Bulgaria. Founded in 1939, the group won the European Folk Art Award in 1978, and it was declared a Masterpiece of the Intangible Heritage of Humanity in 2005. Performing three-part polyphony with features "retained from the pre-Christian times," the group has toured Europe and the US. They are known for their use of Shopluk polyphony, costuming, dancing in a ring (horo), and performing the lazarouvane (the girls' springtime initiation ritual). In 2005 they were included in UNESCO List of Intangible Cultural Heritage elements in Eastern Europe.

The Shopluk genre is characterized by diaphony and parallel voicing. "Diaphony" is a type of polyphony where the melody is performed by one or two soloists, consisting of izvikava and buchi krivo or "to shout out" and "crooked rumbled roars", while the ensemble holds a doubled or trebled drone. Dance and music are asynchronous.

The group was formed by pairs of women recruited as vocal accompanists to the Bistritsa Chetvorka (Bulgarian: Bistritsa Foursome/Quartet), founded around 1935.

== See also ==
- List of Intangible Cultural Heritage elements in Eastern Europe
- Bulgarian State Television Female Vocal Choir
- Heterophony
