= Rijeka Carnival =

Christian Carnival in Croatia

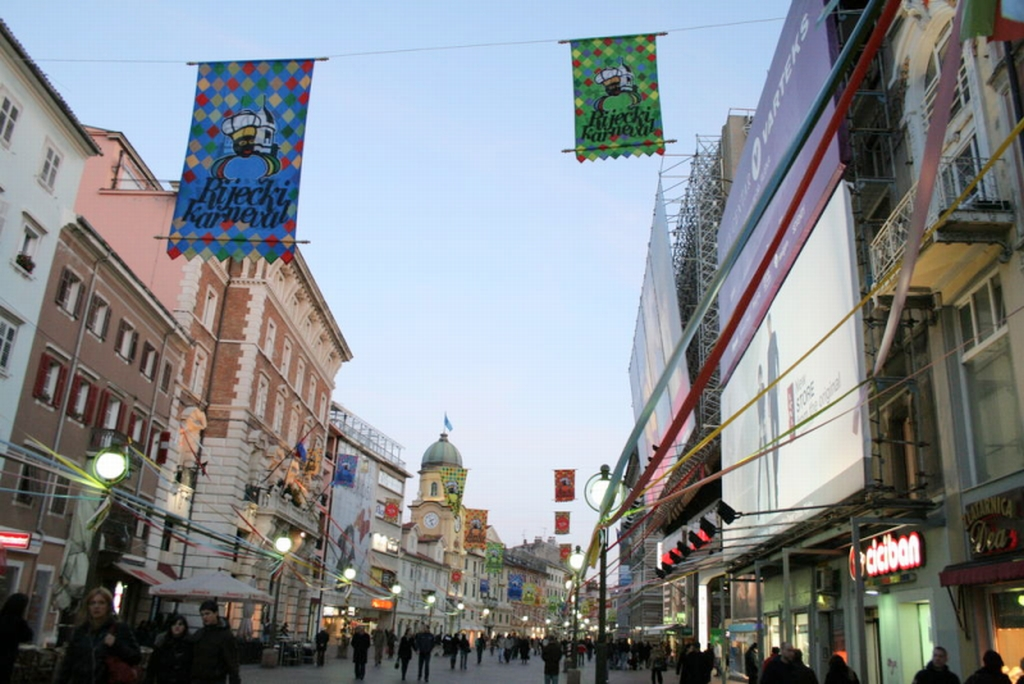
2008 Rijeka Carnival

The Rijeka Carnival (Croatian: Riječki karneval) is held each year before Lent (between late January and early March) in Rijeka, West Croatia. Established in 1982, it has become the biggest carnival in Croatia.

== History ==
About a century ago Rijeka lived its carnival life more intensively than any other town in this part of Europe. Carnival parades were organized as well as carnival balls with the presence of Austrian and Hungarian aristocrats, Russian princesses, German barons, earls and countesses from all over Europe. The rebirth of the Rijeka Carnival started in 1982. It had only three performer groups in its parade and it was neither famous nor popular. The groups were "Lako ćemo", "Pehinarski feštari" and "Halubajski zvončari". All three groups have participated in the carnival each time since the beginning. The largest event happened in 2001 with 144 groups participating. Because of the restrictions that have been made regarding the number of participants in each group, the 2008 carnival had only 99 groups. Nonetheless, 150,000 visitors attended it.

== Events ==
Every year there are numerous events preceding the carnival itself. First the mayor of Rijeka hands the symbolic key of the city over to Meštar Toni, who is "the maestro" of the carnival, and he in turn figuratively becomes the mayor of the city during the carnival season. The same day, a carnival queen is elected. As all the cities around Rijeka have their own events during the carnival time, the Queen and Meštar Toni would be in attendance at most of them.

Also, every year the Carnival charity ball is held in the Governor's palace in Rijeka. It is attended by politicians, people from sport and media life, as well as a number of ambassadors.

The weekend before the main event there are two other events held. One is Rally Paris - Bakar. (after the Dakar rally). The start is a part of Rijeka called Paris after the restaurant located there, and the end is in city of Bakar, located about 20 km south east. All the participants of the rally are masked, and the cars are mostly decorated oldtimers. The other event is the children's carnival, held, like the main one, on Rijeka`s main walkway Korzo. The groups that participate are mostly from kindergartens and elementary schools, including groups from other parts of Croatia and neighboring countries.

== The main event ==
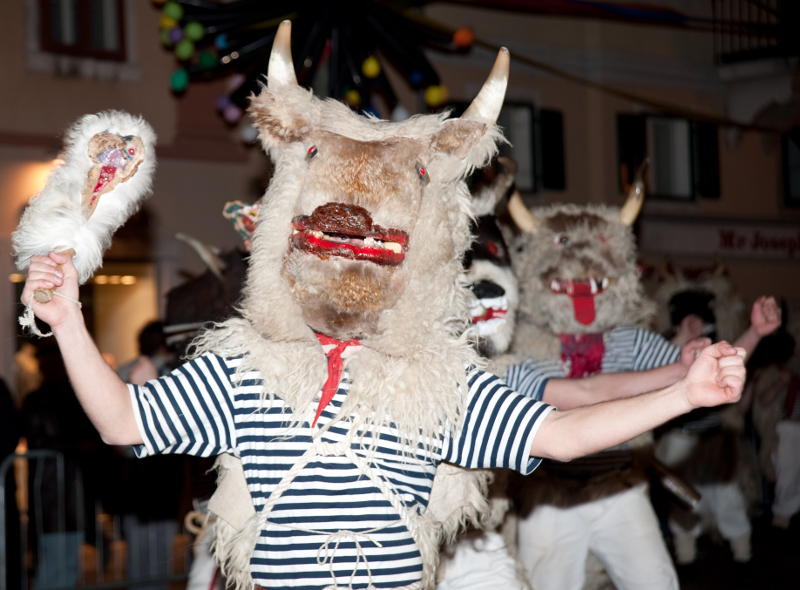
Halubajski zvončari

The main carnival march is held on the last Sunday before the Ash Wednesday. It usually starts at noon. In the front there are the real mayor of Rijeka, the carnival Queen and Meštar Toni. The route of the march has several stages where the hosts present every group, and the main stage is situated in front of the city hall. The mayor, the queen and Meštar Toni stand in front of this stage and they greet all the groups coming afterward. The queen leaves this position only when the group, which she is originally from, pass the route of the carnival. Spectators usually gather to see the march all along its route. If the weather is good, up to 100,000 spectators may attend the carnival. Traditionally, the last group are Halubajski zvončari, and when they pass the march is over. Depending on the number of participants, this usually happens between 8 p.m. and 9 p.m.

Of course, the march does not mark the end of the carnival. On the same evening, there is an event called the burning of the Pust. Pust is a puppet, that has some satiric name, very often after some politician, and he is blamed for all the bad things that happened in the preceding year. This event is held in Rijeka harbor, and before he is taken to the sea, a reading of charges is held, where a spokesman reads all of his sins. Afterwards, a boat takes the Pust to the sea and it is burned there. This tradition is held in all places around Rijeka, but it is held on Tuesday or Wednesday after the carnival.

In the last few years there are several parties held on various locations in Rijeka, some starting day before the carnival, and end in the night after the carnival. The most known is a carnival party held on Korzo, where various DJs perform.

== See also ==
- Carnival
- Rijeka
