= Zvončari =

Croatian folk custom

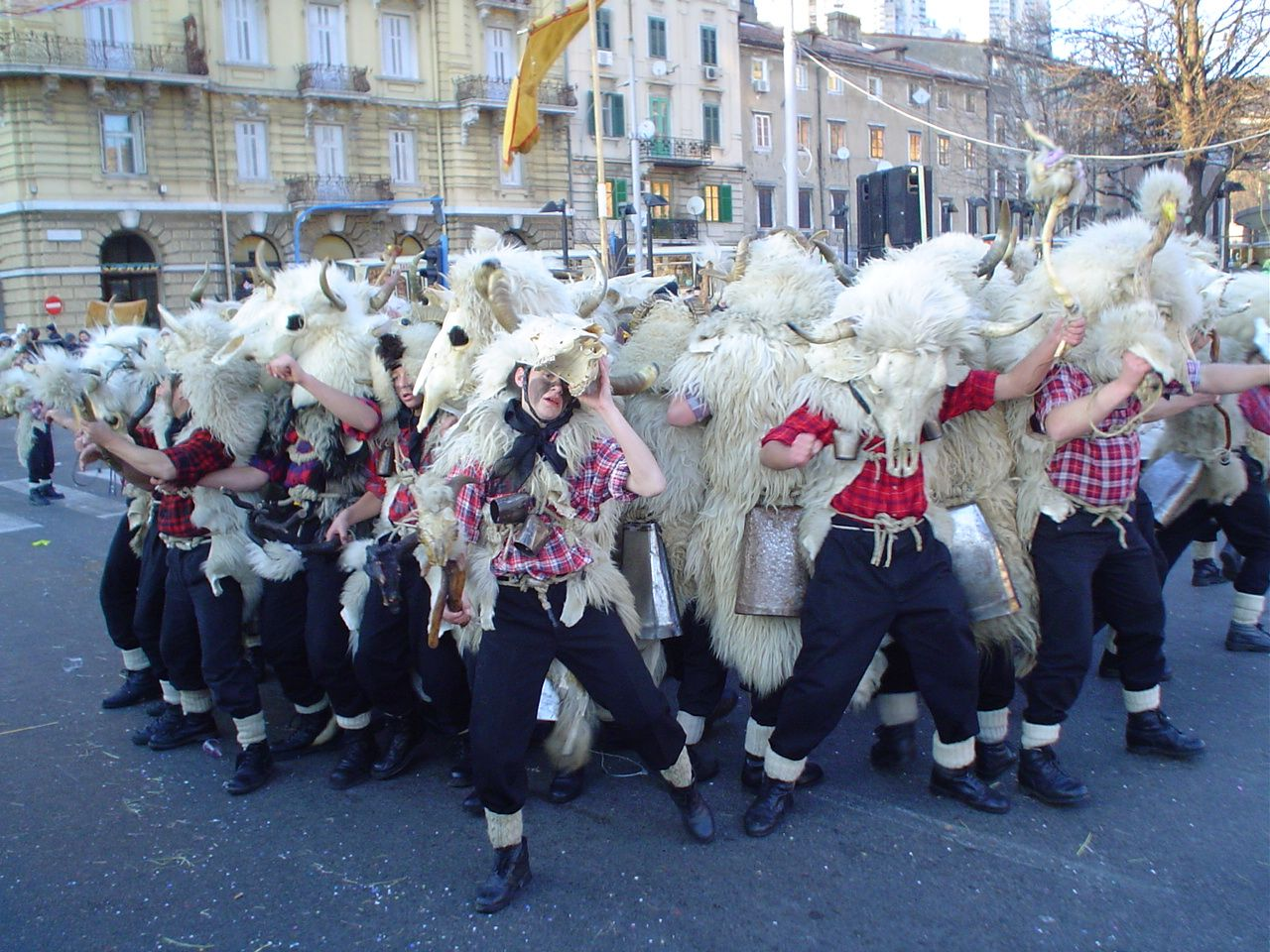
- Zvončari at the Rijeka Carnival
- Place of origin: Primorje-Gorski Kotar County, Croatia

Annual carnival bell ringers’ pageant from the Kastav area
- UNESCO Intangible Cultural Heritage
- Country: Croatia
- Reference: 00243
- Region: Europe and North America

Inscription history
- Inscription: 2009 (4th session)
- List: Representative

Zvončari ("bellmen") is the characteristic folk custom maintained in the region around Rijeka, west Croatia. It was added to UNESCO's Representative List of the Intangible Cultural Heritage of Humanity in 2009.

The custom dates to Slavic pagan antiquity and remains typical for this region. The primary task of Zvončari is to scare away evil spirits of winter and to stir up a new spring-time cycle. During the Rijeka Carnival, Zvončari march from village to village throughout the region, following the same centuries-old route, making an extraordinary amount of noise, fueled in part by the wine provided by the locals' en route.

== Description ==
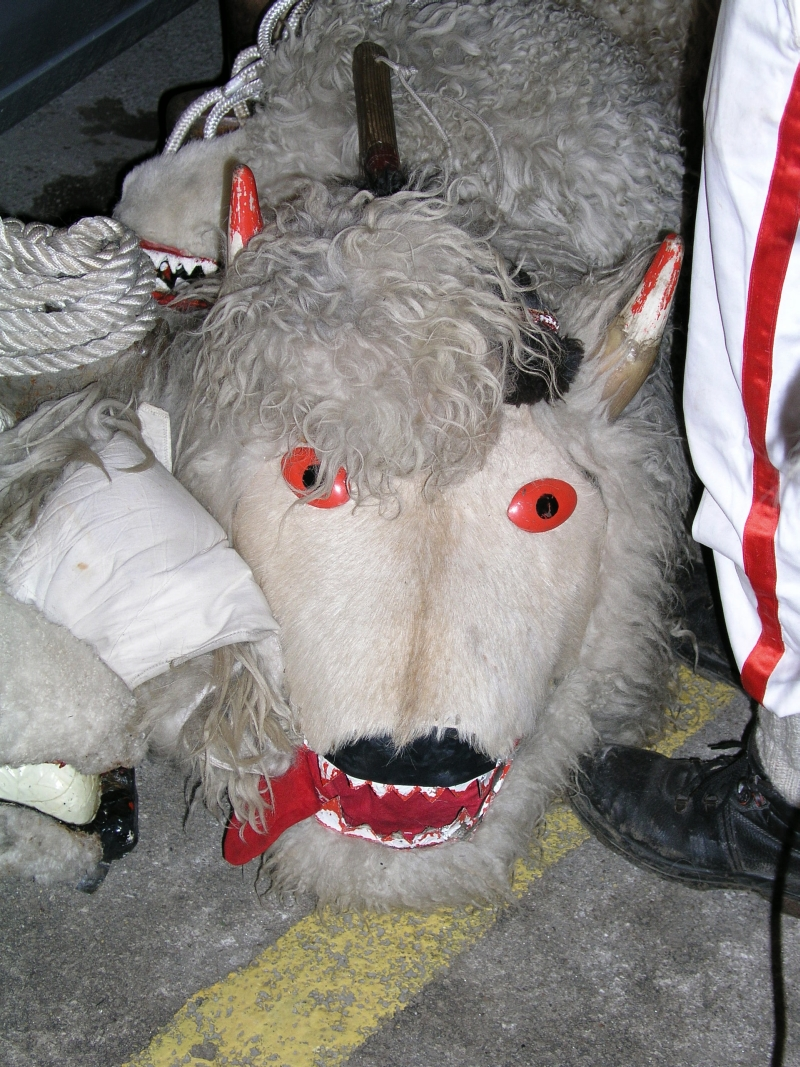
Mask

The standard Zvončar costume includes white trousers, striped shirt, and a sheepskin throw. In their hands they hold a "balta" or "bačuka" — a stylized mace, and around the waist one or more big brass bells. The costume varies from village to village; for example, Zvončari of Halubje and Grobnik (Dondolaši) wear special stylized masks representing fantastic animal heads, while Zvončari of Žejane (populated by Istro-Romanians) and Brgud wear "flower hats". Local legend claims that it was the Zvončari that scared away invading Tatars or Turks during the Ottoman conquest, with shepherds doning masks on their heads, along with belted-on bells, produced a deafening noise that scared the enemy away. From that time on, a mace became part of the standard equipment of Zvončari.

The Zvončari participate regularly in the international Rijeka Carnival.

== See also ==
- Busójárás
- Kurentovanje
- Pre-Christian Alpine traditions
- Rijeka carnival
