= Mohács =

- Town
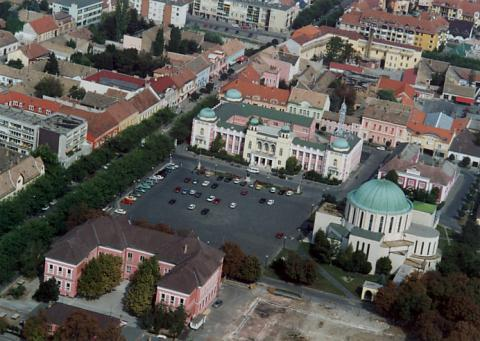
- Aerial view

- Flag Coat of arms

- Location of Mohács
- Coordinates: 45.99593°N 18.67985°E
- Country: Hungary
- County: Baranya
- District: Mohács

Government
  - Mayor: Gábor Pávkovics (Fidesz)

Area
  - Total: 112.23 km^{2} (43.33 sq mi)

Population (2011)
  - Total: 17,808
  - Density: 158.67/km^{2} (411.0/sq mi)
- Time zone: UTC+1 (CET)
  - Summer (DST): UTC+2 (CEST)
- Postal code: 7700
- Area code: (+36) 69
- Website: www.mohacs.hu

Mohács (Hungarian pronunciation: [ˈmohaːt͡ʃ]; Croatian: Mohač; German: Mohatsch; Serbian: Мохач; Turkish: Mohaç; Romanian: Mohaci) is a town in Baranya County, Hungary, on the right bank of the Danube.

== Etymology ==
The name probably comes from the Slavic *Mъchačь,*Mocháč: mъchъ (moss, Hungarian moha is a loanword from Slavic) + the Slavic suffix -ačь, like Slovak Mochnáč or Czech Macháč. See 1093/1190/1388 Mohach.

== History ==
Two famous battles took place in the vicinity of Mohács in 1526 and 1687. These battles represented the beginning and end, respectively, of the Ottoman domination of Hungary.

In Roman times there was a camp on the banks of the Danube near Mohács.

In the medieval Kingdom of Hungary, Mohács formed part of the historical Baranya county, and during Ottoman rule it functioned as the administrative seat of the Sanjak of Mohács, an Ottoman administrative unit. After the Habsburgs took the area from the Ottomans, Mohács was included in the restored Baranya county.

In 1910 the population of the Mohács district numbered 56,909 people, of whom 21,951 spoke German, 20,699 Hungarian, 4,312 Serbian, and 421 Croatian. Another 9,600 inhabitants were listed as speaking "other languages".

Until the end of World War II, Danube Swabians comprised the majority of the inhabitants - called locally Stifolder, because their ancestors came in the 17th and 18th centuries from Fulda (district). Most of the former German settlers were expelled to Allied-occupied Germany and Allied-occupied Austria in 1945-1948, in accordance with the 1945 Potsdam Agreement.

== Events ==
Every spring, the town hosts the annual Busójárás carnival. These traditional festivities have been inscribed on the Representative List of the Intangible Cultural Heritage of Humanity of the UNESCO in 2009.

== Demographics ==
Historical population of Mohács
Year	Pop.	±% p.a.
1870	10,684	—
1880	10,905	+0.20%
1890	12,678	+1.52%
1900	13,929	+0.95%
1910	14,870	+0.66%
1920	13,344	−1.08%
1930	14,695	+0.97%
1941	15,442	+0.45%
1949	16,088	+0.51%
1960	18,015	+1.03%
1970	19,641	+0.87%
1980	21,383	+0.85%
1990	20,326	−0.51%
2001	19,223	−0.51%
2011	17,808	−0.76%

According to the 2011 census, the total population of Mohács was 17,808, of whom there were 15,842 (84.2%) Hungarians, 1,723 (9.7%) Germans, 700 (3.9%) Croats, and 537 (3%) Romani. 14% of the total population did not declare their ethnicity. In Hungary, people can declare more than one ethnicity (dual identity), so the sum exceeds the total population.

== Twin towns – sister cities ==
Mohács is twinned with:

- Beli Manastir, Croatia
- Bensheim, Germany
- Beykoz, Turkey
- Câmpia Turzii, Romania
- Siemianowice Śląskie, Poland
- Sveti Filip i Jakov, Croatia
- Wattrelos, France

== Notable citizens ==
- Ferenc Pfaff (1851–1913), Hungarian architect
- Endre Rozsda (1913–1999), Hungarian-French Painter
- Norbert Michelisz (1984), Hungarian racing driver

== Sport ==
Mohácsi TE is the town's association football club.

== Photos ==
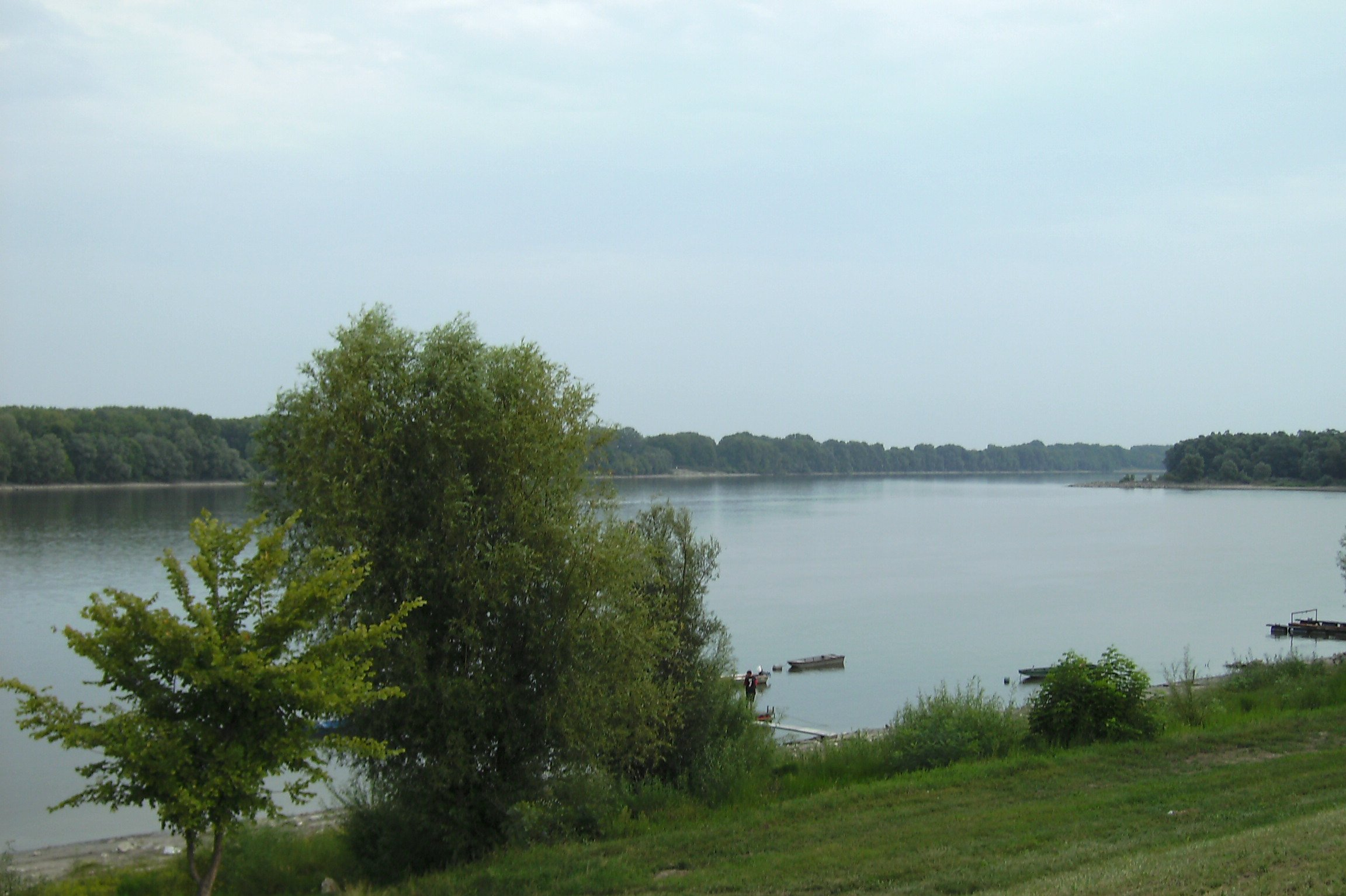
The Danube at Mohács

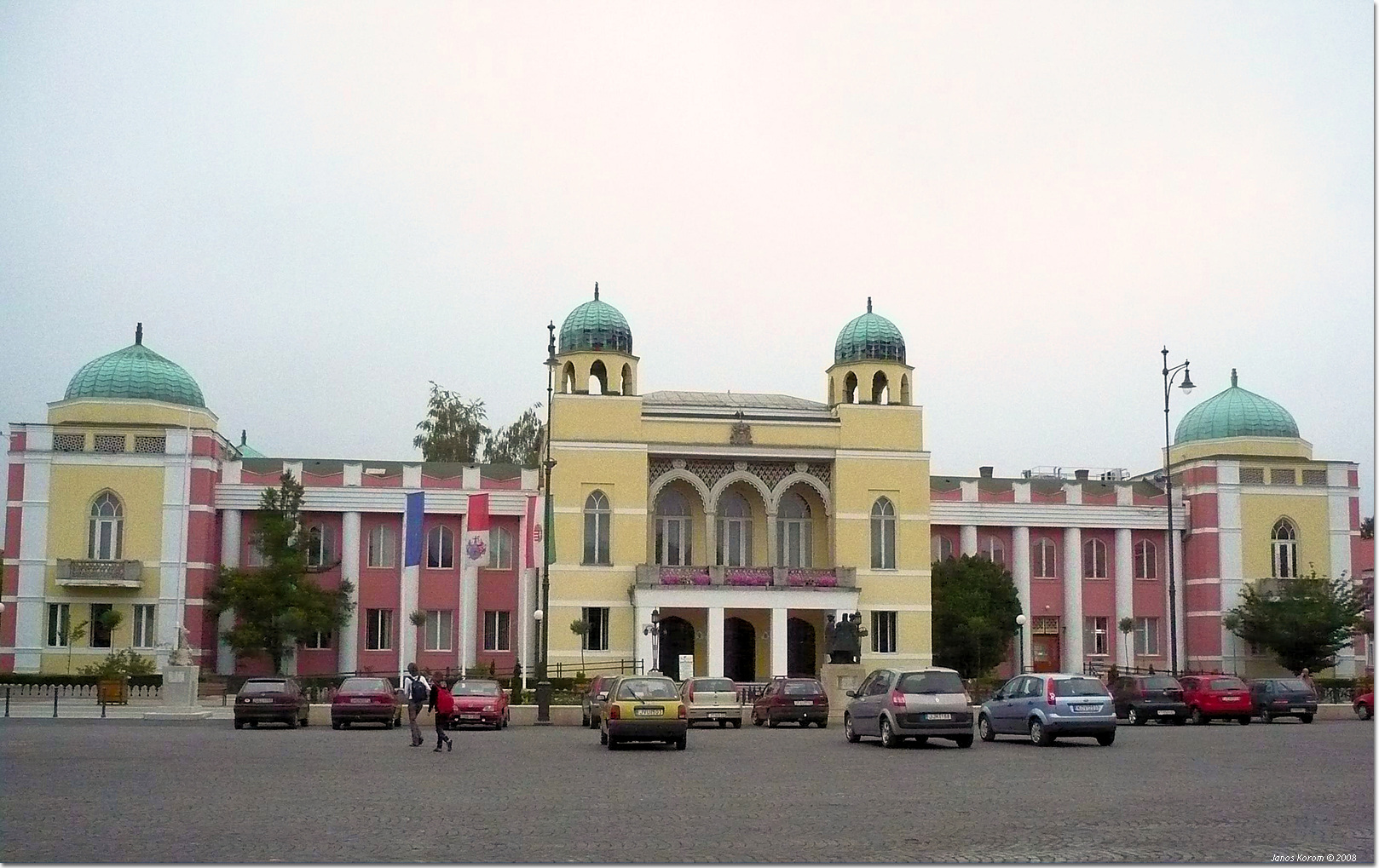
Town Hall

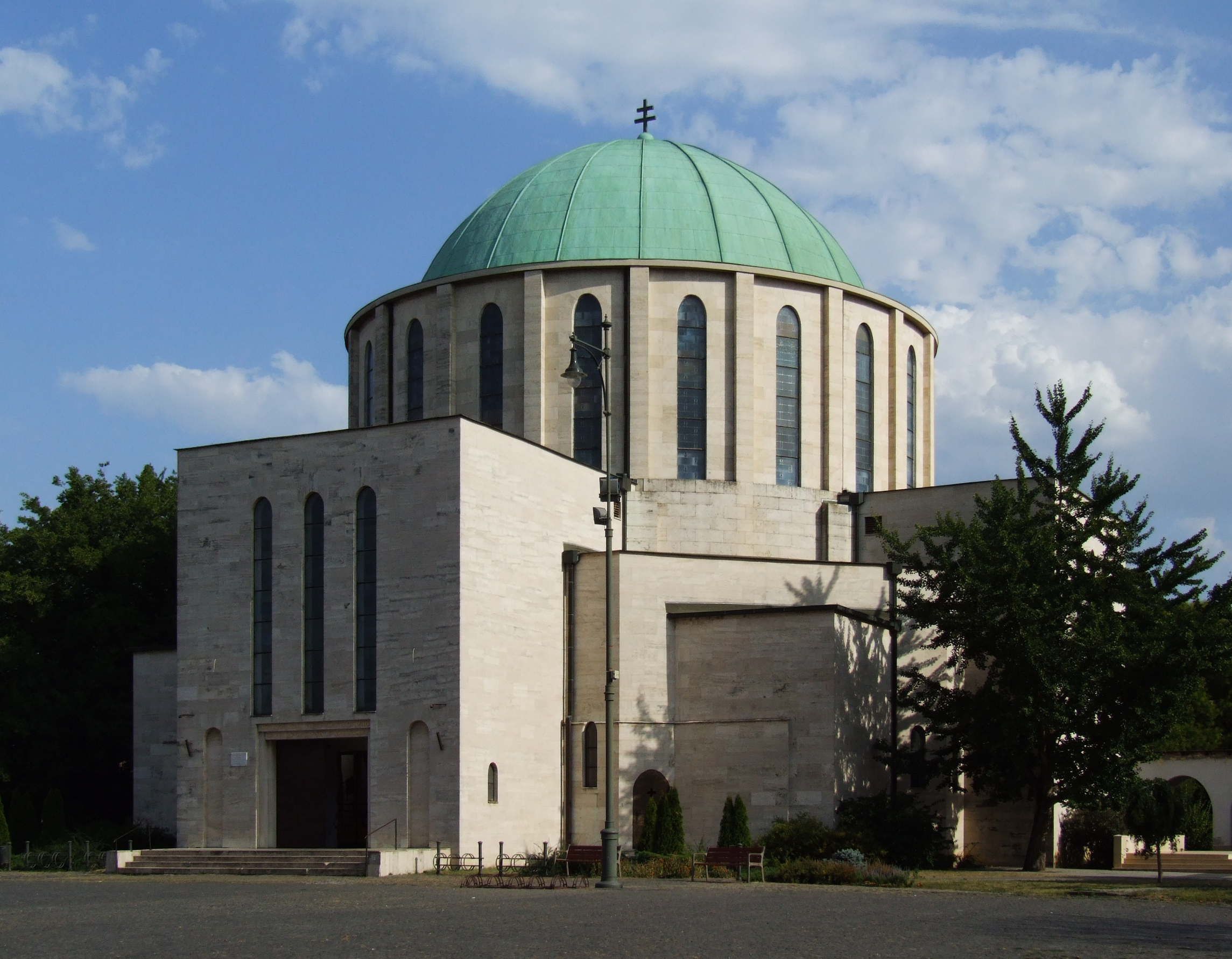
Church in the center of city

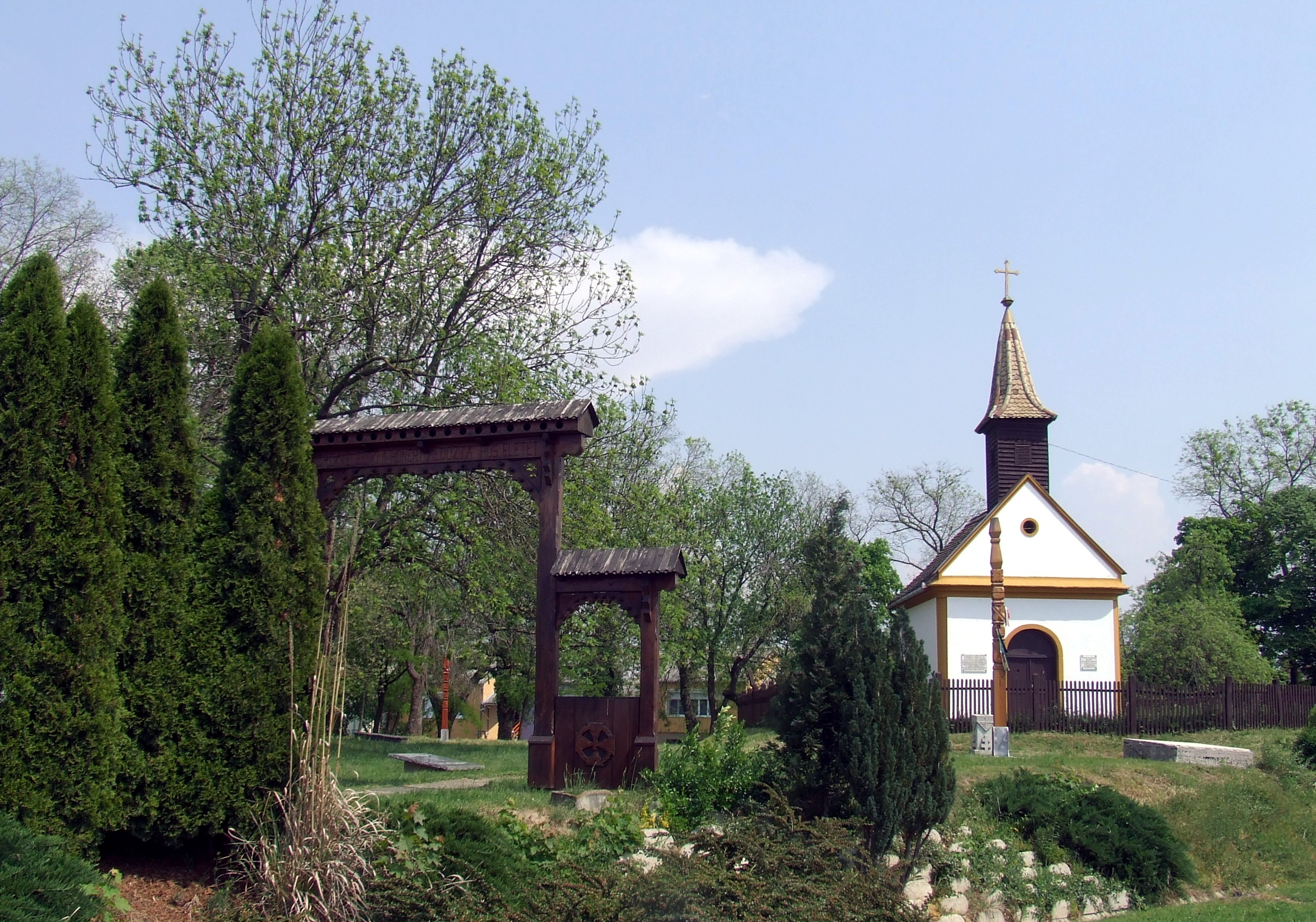
Memorial park

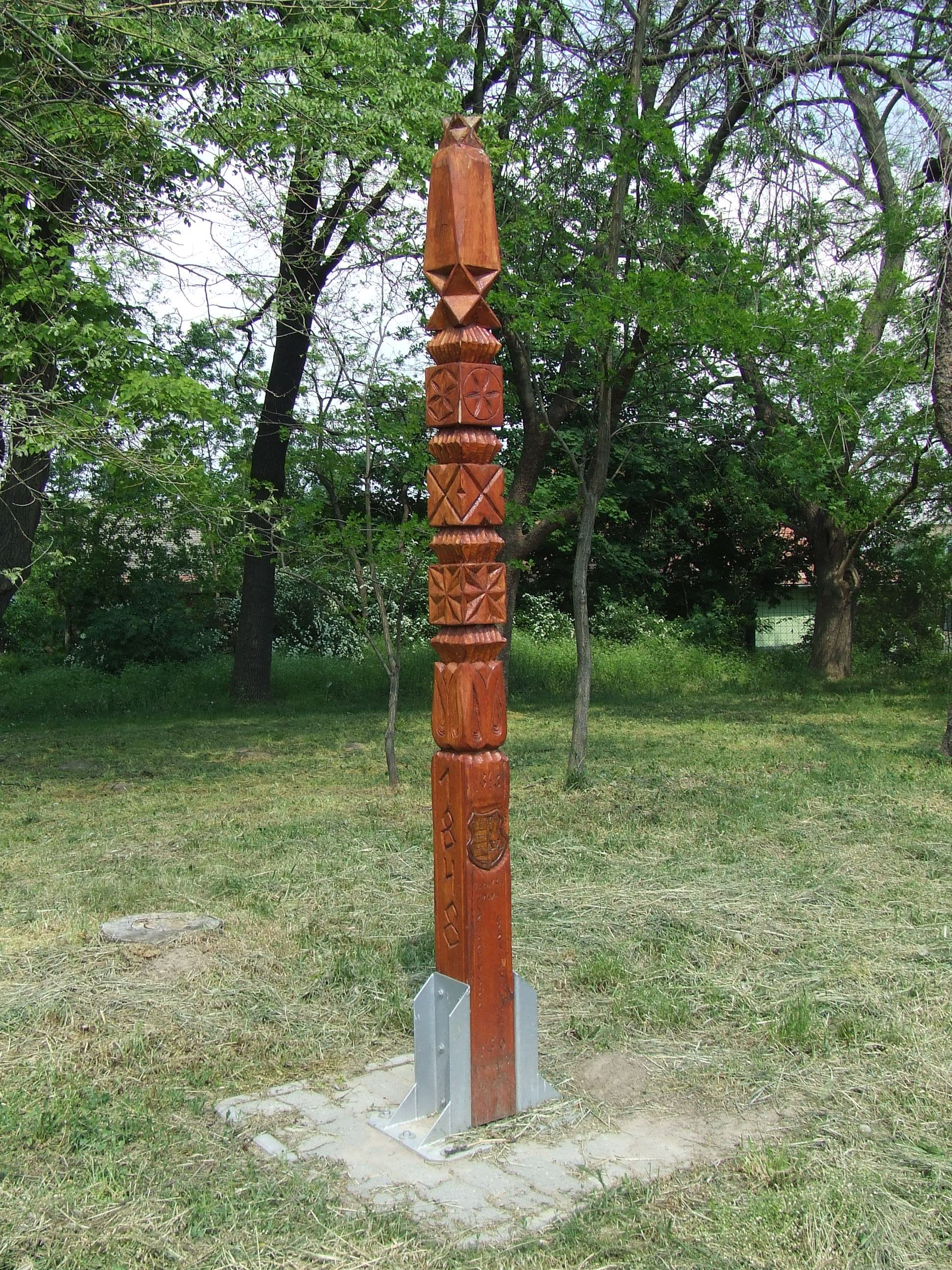
Memorial park

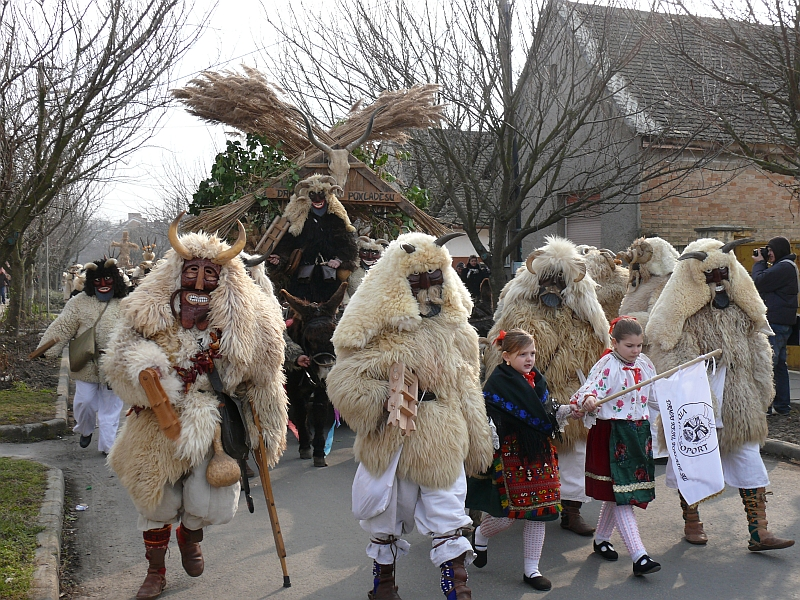
Annual carnival Busójárás

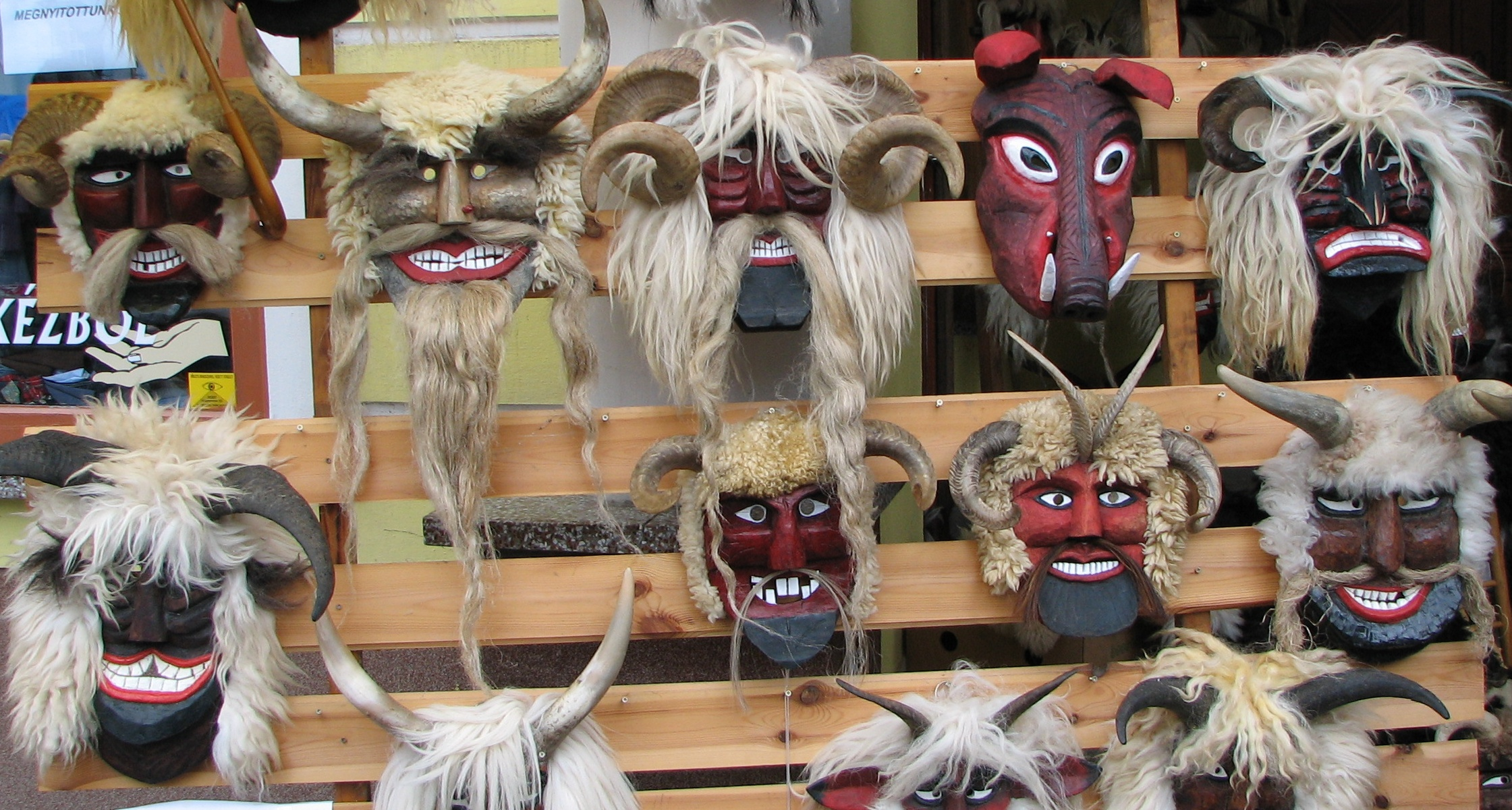
Buso masks

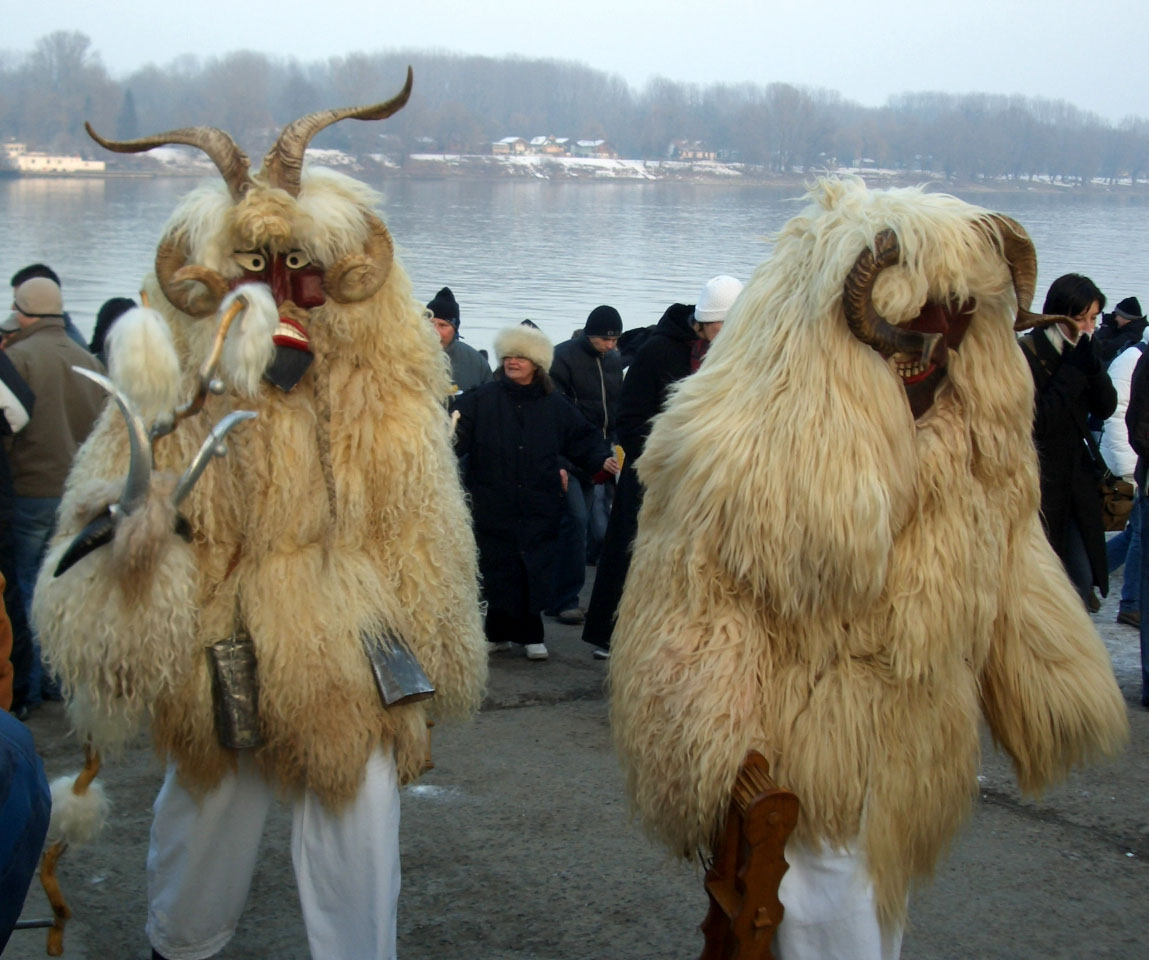
Carnival

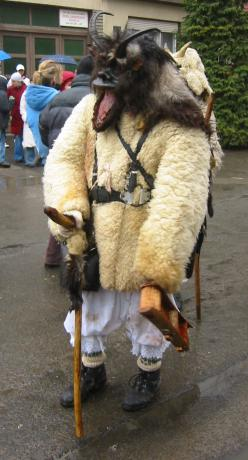
Carnival

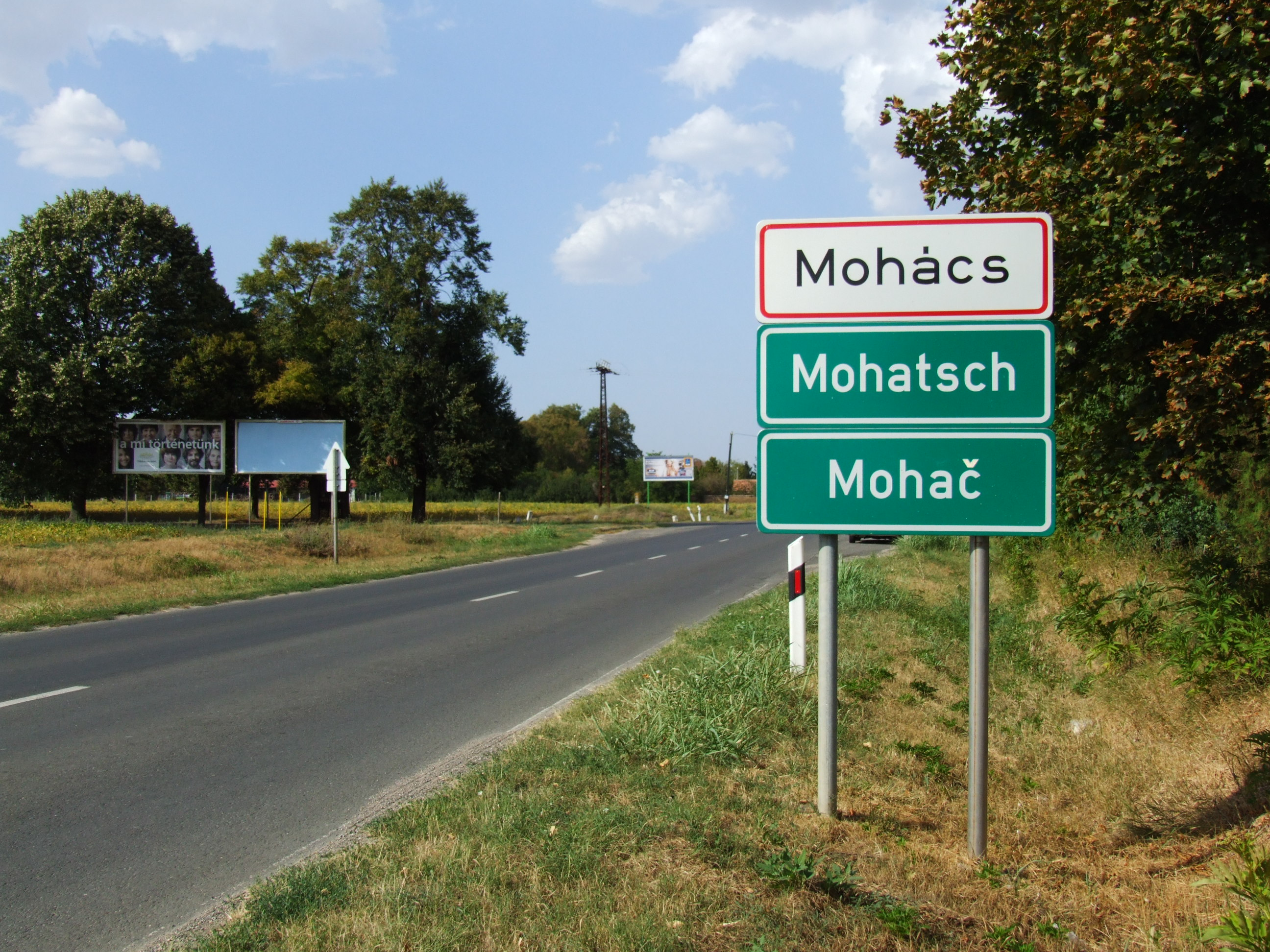
Multilingual (Hungarian, German and Croatian) city limit sign
