= Busójárás =

Šokci religious celebration in Hungary

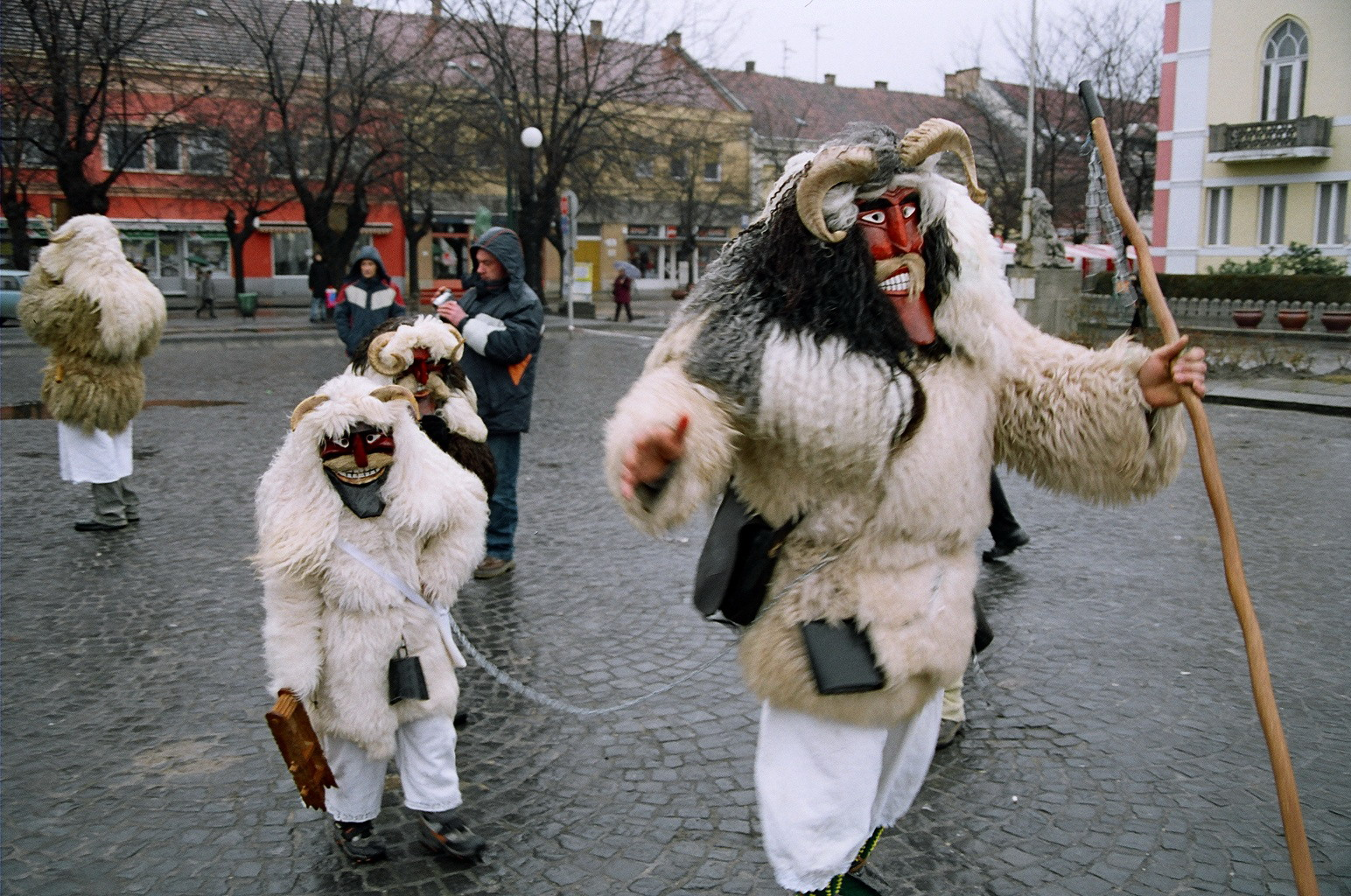
- Some masked Busós. February 2006.
- Status: Active
- Genre: Carnival
- Frequency: Annual
- Locations: Mohács, Hungary

Busó festivities at Mohács: masked end-of-winter carnival custom
- UNESCO Intangible Cultural Heritage
- Country: Hungary
- Reference: 00252
- Region: Europe and North America

Inscription history
- Inscription: 2009 (4th session)
- List: Representative

The busójárás (Hungarian, meaning "Busó-walking"; in Croatian: Pohod bušara) is an annual celebration in the town of Mohács, Hungary, held at the end of the Carnival season ("farsang"), ending the day before Ash Wednesday. It originated in the 18th century amongst the Šokci living in the area. The celebration features Busós (people wearing traditional masks) and includes folk music, masquerading, parades and dancing. Busójárás lasts six days, usually during February. It starts on a Thursday, followed by the Kisfarsang (Little Farsang) carnival on Friday, with the biggest celebration, farsang vasárnap (Farsang Sunday) on the Sunday before Easter Sunday; the celebration then ends with farsangtemetés (Burial of Farsang) on the following Tuesday (Shrove Tuesday or Mardi Gras). These traditional festivities have been inscribed on the Representative List of the Intangible Cultural Heritage of Humanity of the UNESCO in 2009.

Locals explain the Carnival with two related but different legends.

According to the most popular legend, during the Ottoman times of the territory, people from Mohács fled the town, and started living in the nearby swamps and woods to avoid Ottoman (Turkish) troops. One night, while they were sitting and talking around the fire, an old Šokac man appeared suddenly from nowhere, and said to them: "Don't be afraid, your lives will soon turn to good, and you'll return to your homes. Until that time, prepare for the battle, carve various weapons and scary masks for yourselves, and wait for a stormy night when a masked knight will come to you." He disappeared as suddenly as he arrived. The refugees followed his orders, and some days later, on a stormy night, the knight arrived. He ordered them to put on their masks and go back to Mohács, making as much noise as possible. They followed his lead. The Turks were so frightened by the noise, the masks, and the storm in the night, that they thought demons were attacking them, and they ran away from the town before sunrise.

In the older, less popular story, the busós are scaring away not the Turks but Winter itself.

In any case, the locals have celebrated the Busójárás in early February every year ever since, hosting "guest Busó teams" from neighbouring countries (Croatia and Serbia, local Šokci Croats and Slovenia) and also from Poland.

== Gallery ==
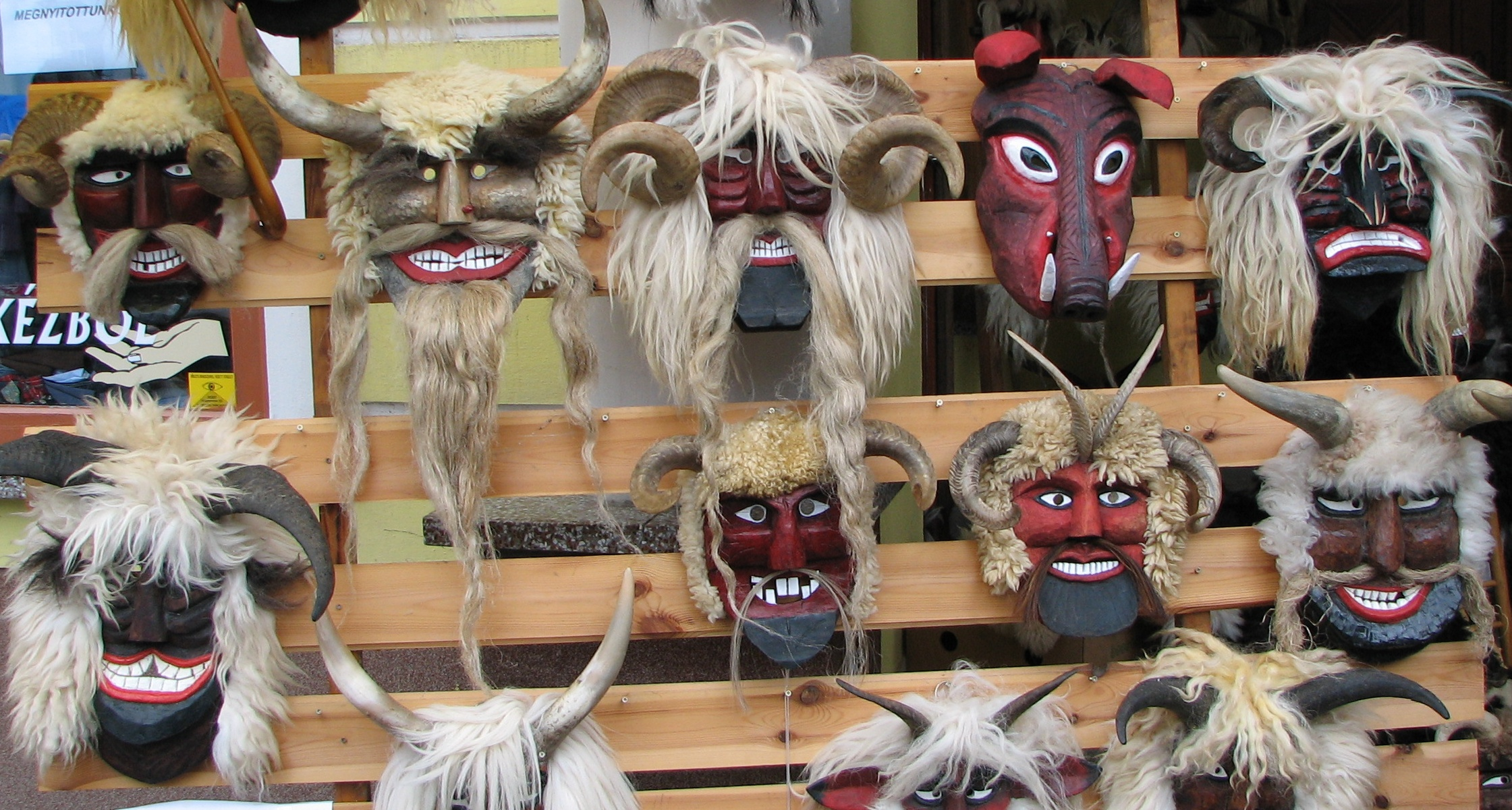
Busó masks (Mohács, February 2006)

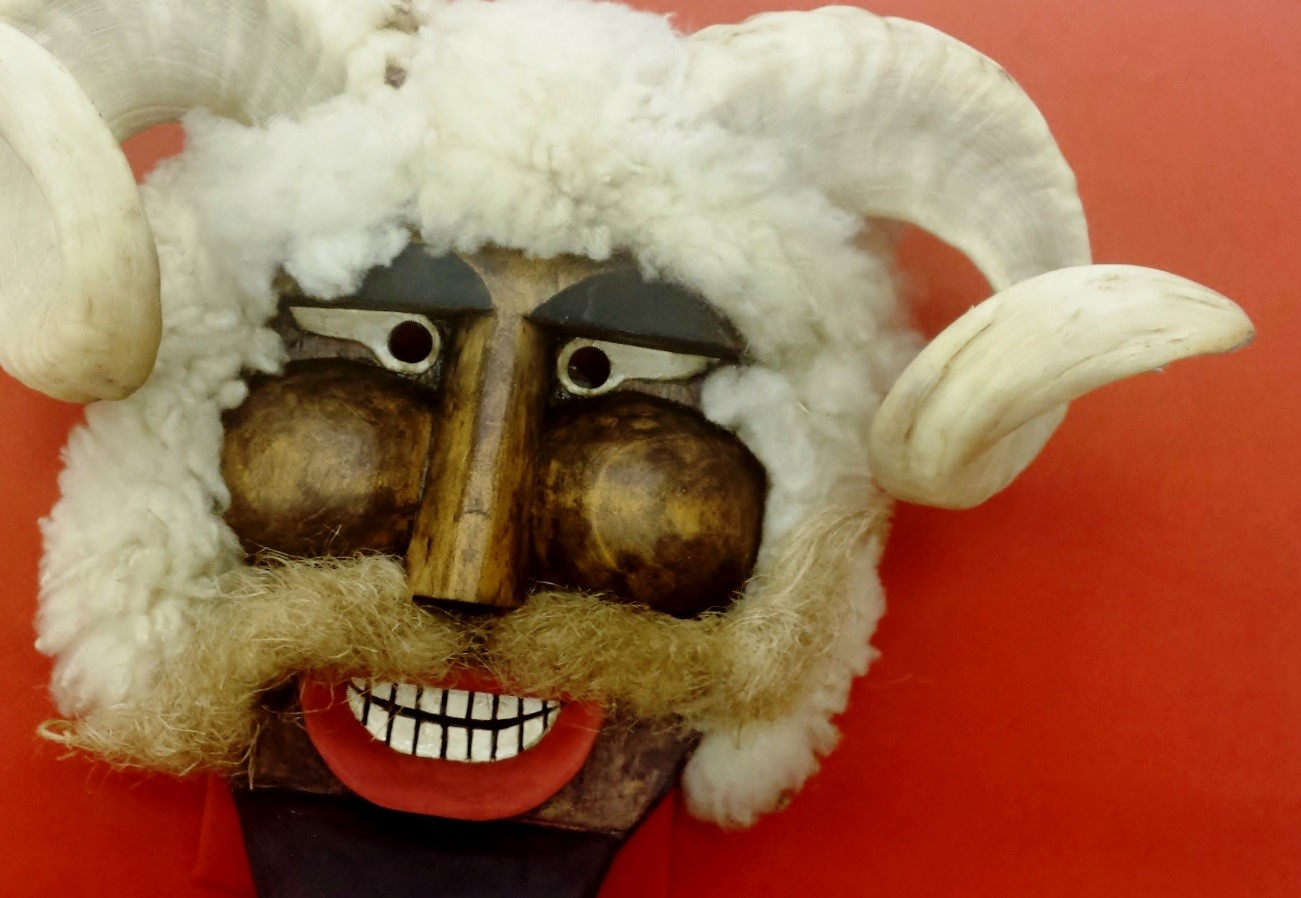
Busó mask from the collection of the Museu da Imigração de São Paulo (Immigration Museum of São Paulo) - Brazil

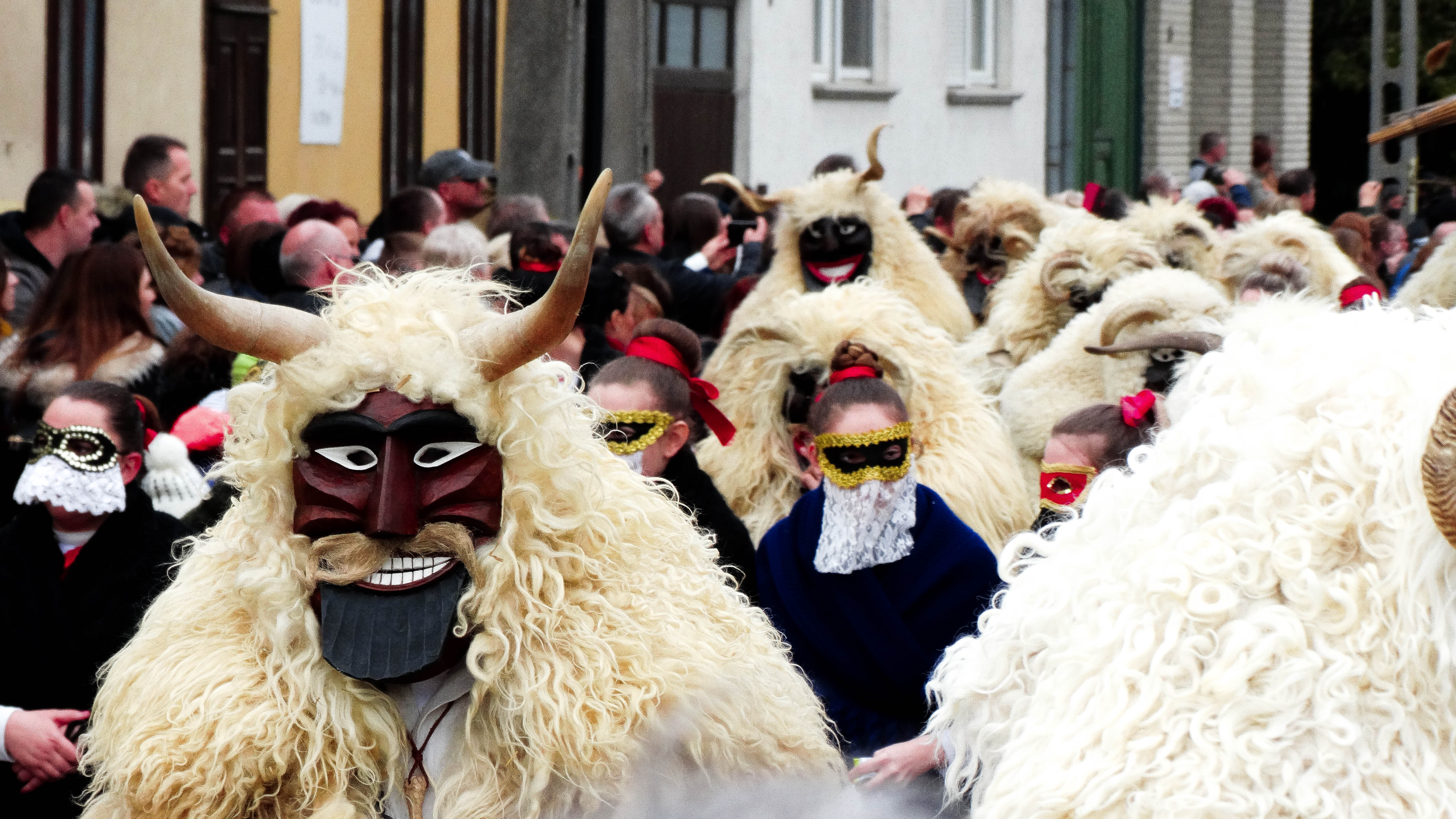
Busó-walking - Busójárás

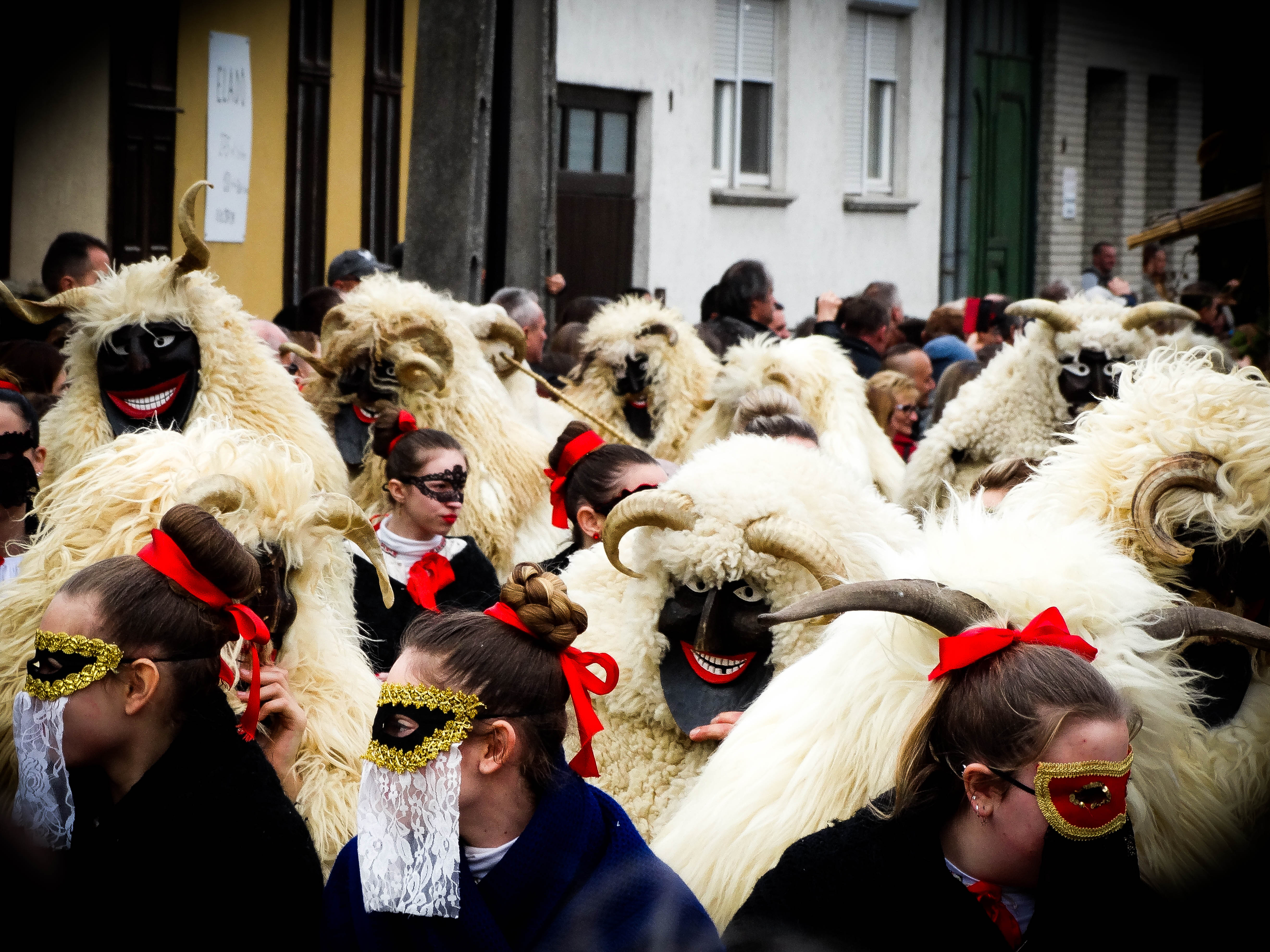
Busó-walking of the Hungarian Carnival - Farsangi busójárás.

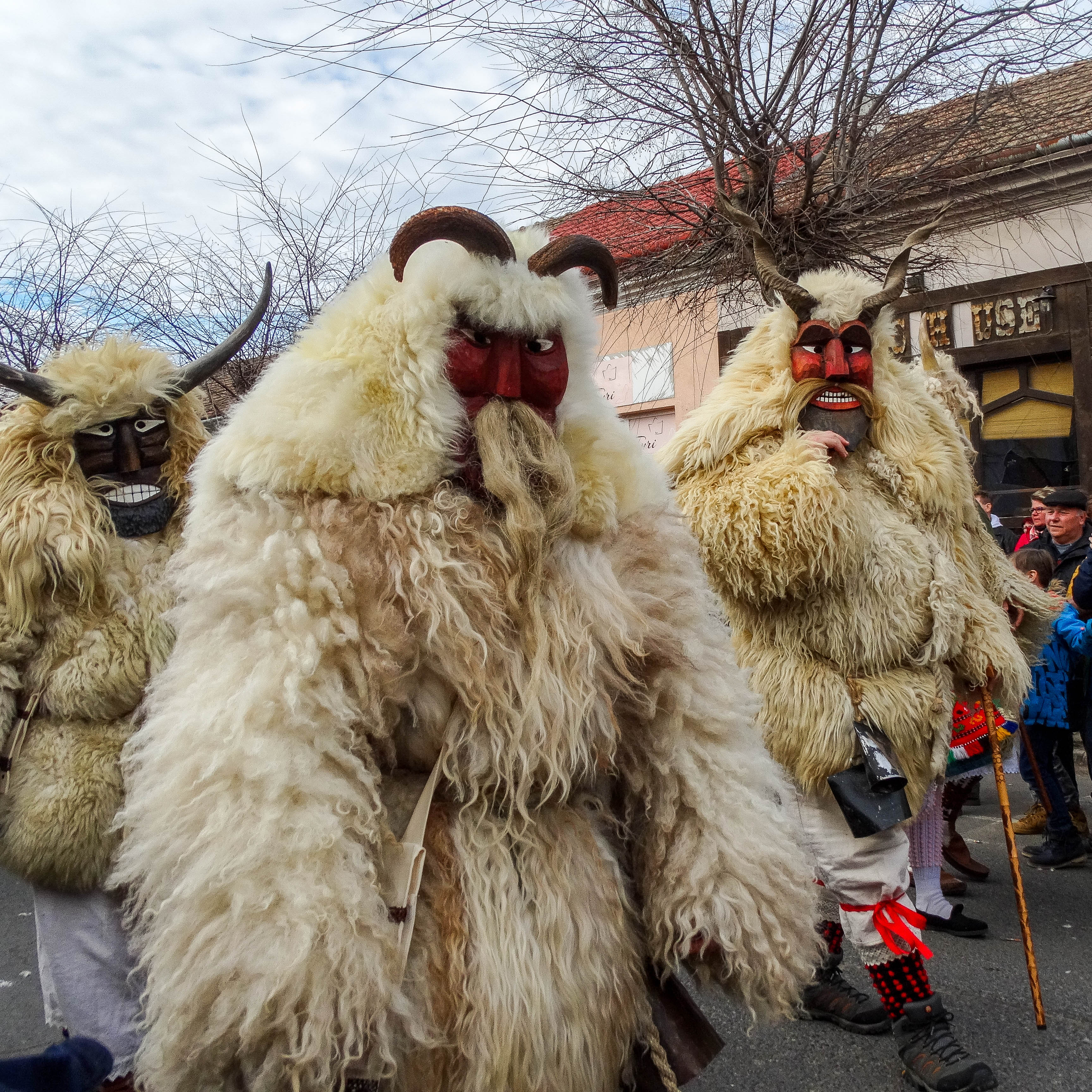
Busós

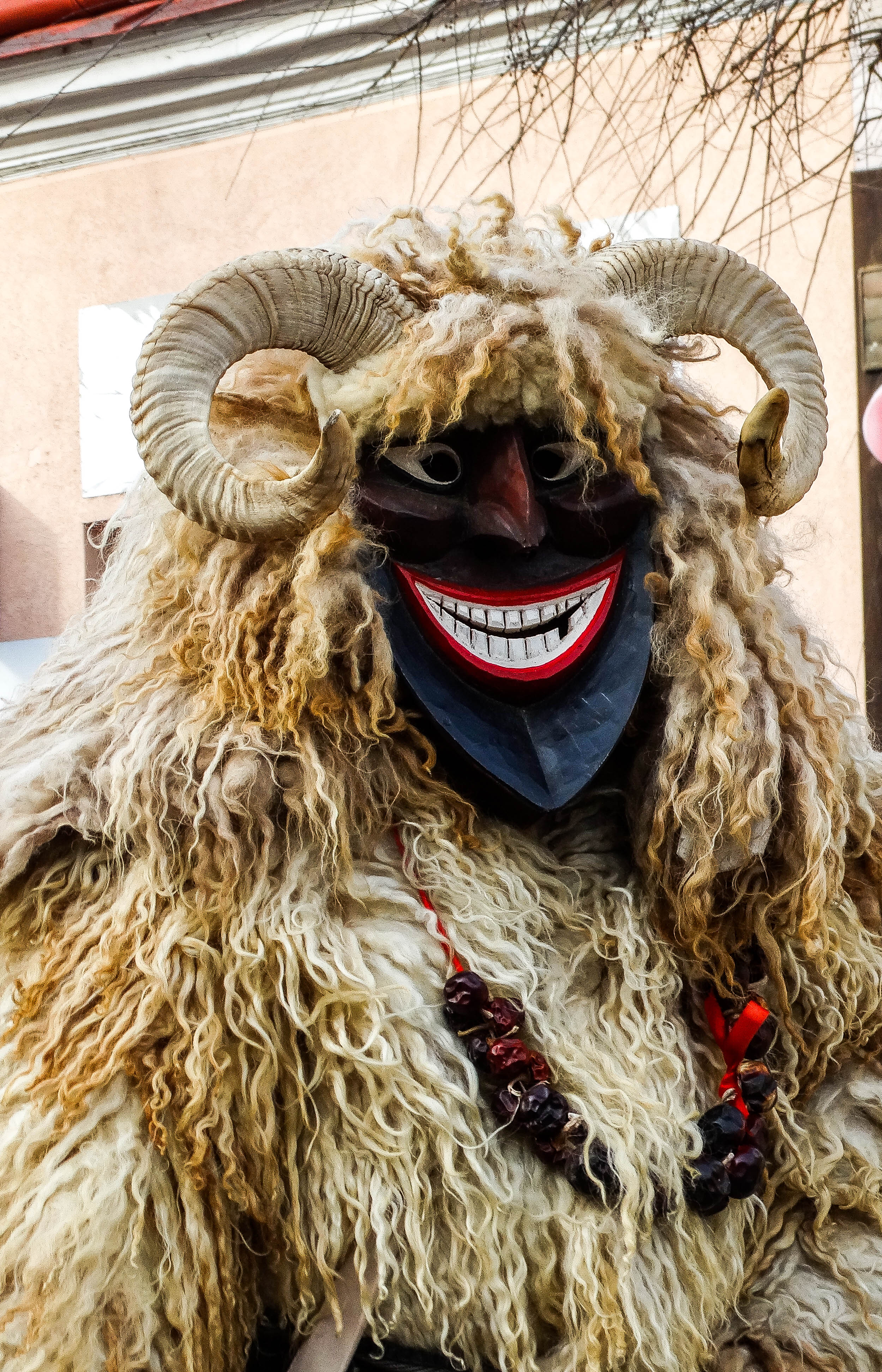
Busó

== See also ==
- Kurentovanje
- Kukeri
- Pre-Christian Alpine traditions
- Zvončari
