= Tsar Maximilian =

18th-century Russian play

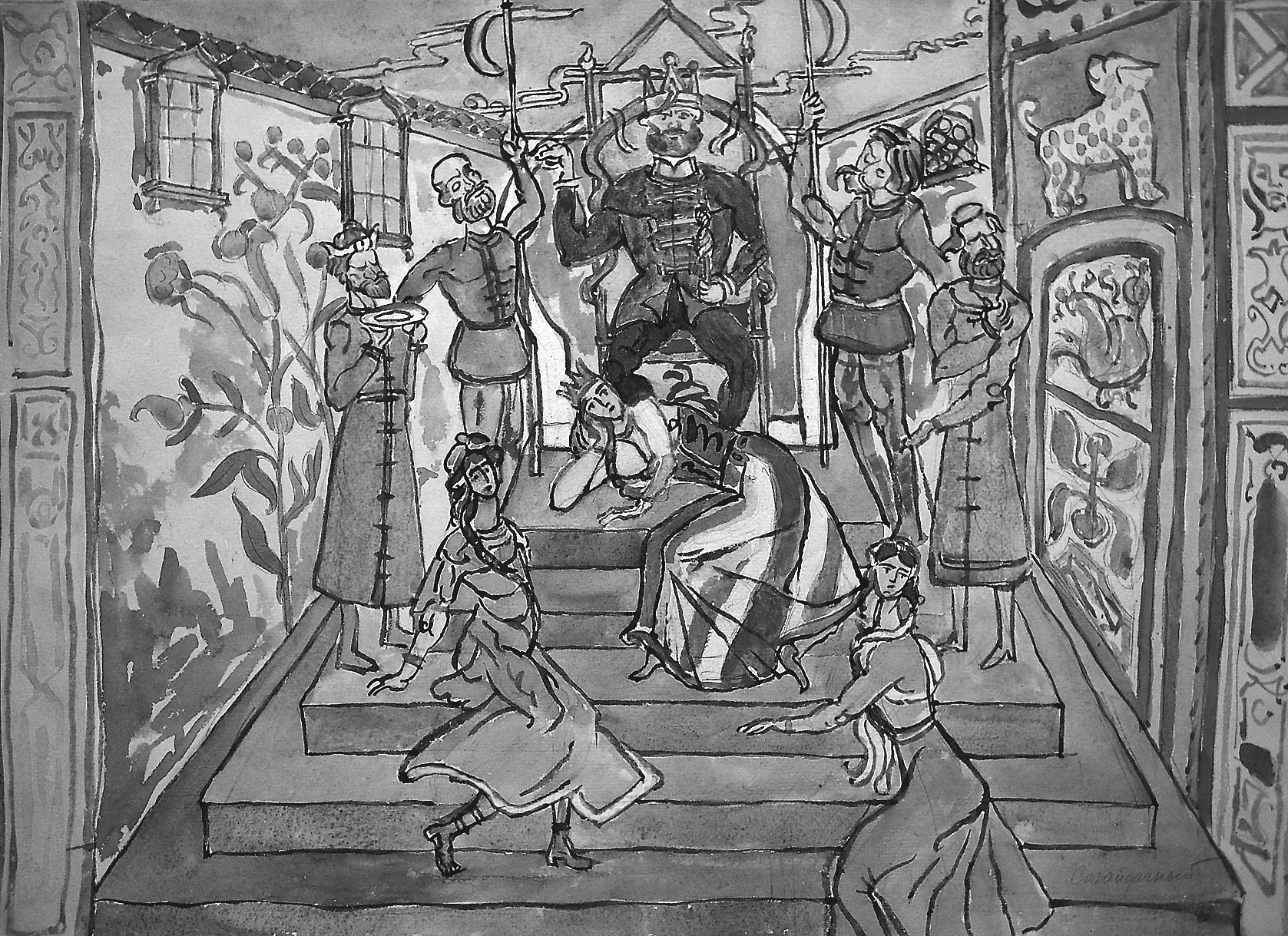
Tsar Maximilian. 1910

Tsar Maximilian (Russian: Царь Максимилиан) is a well-known and complex Russian folk theatre, having enjoyed wide popularity throughout European Russia from the 18th to the early 20th century.
