= La secchia rapita (Salieri) =

1772 opera by Antonio Salieri

- Dramma eroicomico by Antonio Salieri
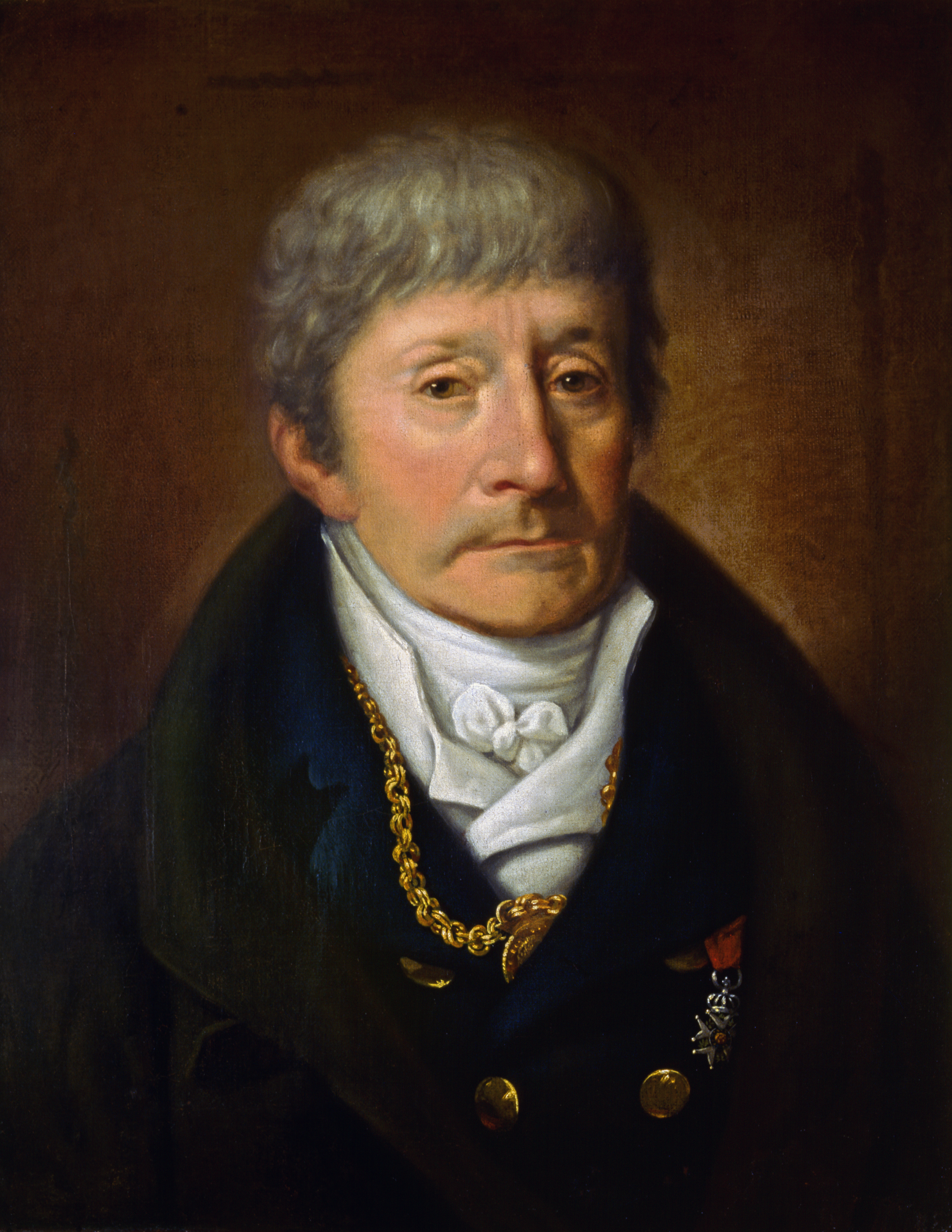
- Portrait of Salieri by Joseph Willibrord Mähler (1815)
- Translation: The Stolen Bucket
- Librettist: Giovanni Gastone Boccherini
- Language: Italian
- Based on: La secchia rapita by Alessandro Tassoni (1622)
- Premiere: 21 October 1772; Theater am Kärntnertor, Vienna, Archduchy of Austria, Holy Roman Empire (Note: Many sources say the premiere was at the Burgtheater in Vienna, e.g., Rolandi 1927, Charlton 1971, Rice 1994, Università di Bologna Dipartimento di Beni Culturali.)

La secchia rapita (The Stolen Bucket or The Rape of the Bucket) (Note: Here the word "rape", is used in the archaic sense of "to snatch", "to plunder" as in Alexander Pope's The Rape of the Lock.) is a three-act 18th century dramma eroicomico opera in Italian. Antonio Salieri composed the music and Giovanni Gastone Boccherini wrote the libretto, basing it on Alessandro Tassoni's 1622 poem of the same name. The first performance was at the Theater am Kärntnertor in Vienna on 21 October 1772.

The mock-heroic opera dramatizes the War of the Bucket, a 1325 conflict between the city-states of Bologna and Modena. Secchia spoofs the conventions of operia seria, particularly the librettos of Pietro Metastasio. Initially very popular, Secchia received twenty-one performances its first season in Vienna and was then performed in Mannheim, Dresden, Prague, Parma, and Modena over the next fifteen years. The next performance was two centuries later when it was revived in Modena in 1990.

== Roles ==
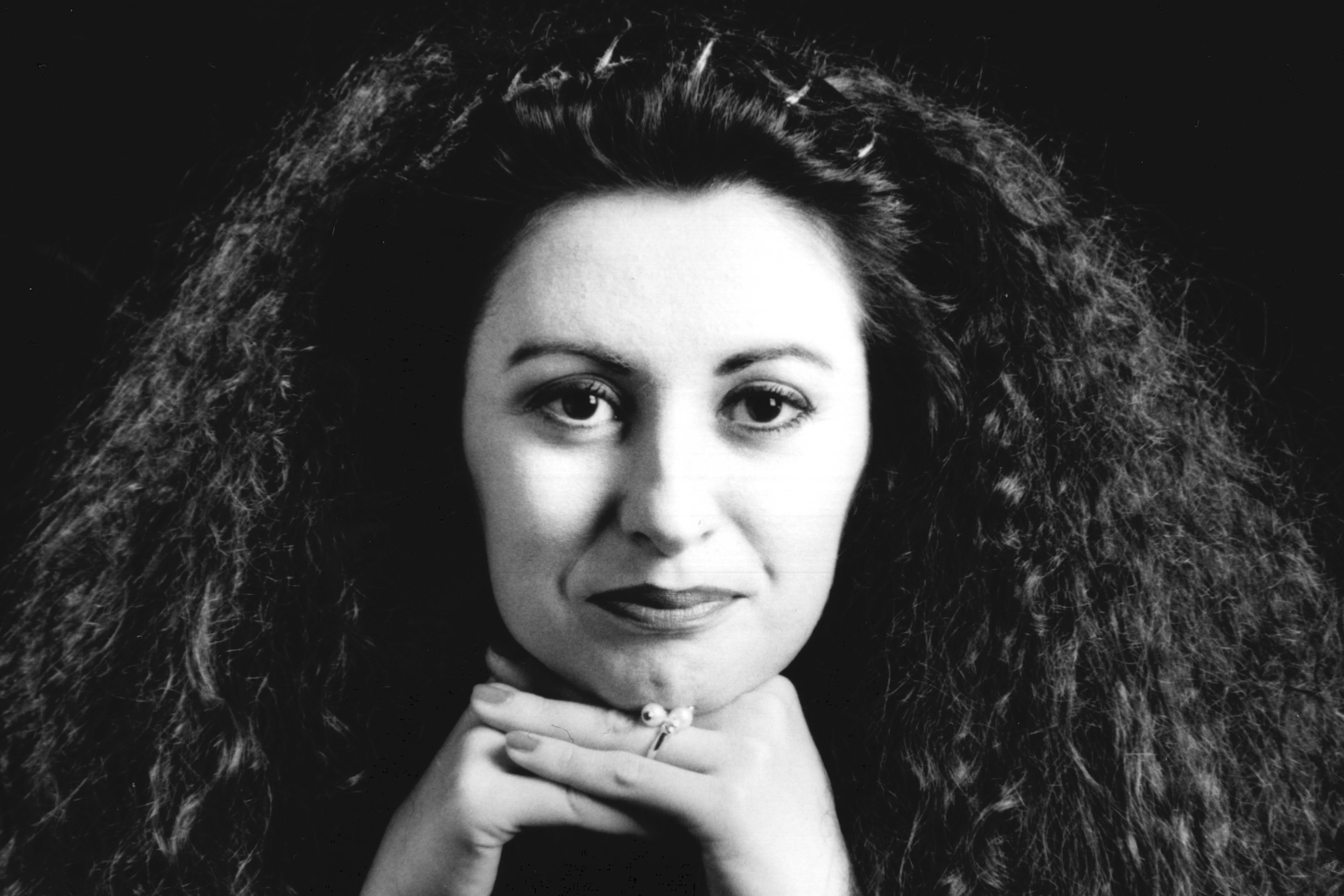
Daniela Lojorro, who sang the lead in the 1990 production at Modena

Roles, voice types, 1990 cast
Role	Voice type	Modena cast, 1990 Conductor: Frans Brüggen (Note: The production was double-cast; the first night cast appears initially.)
Renoppia, Amazon warrior	soprano	Daniela Lojarro; Antonietta Cozzoli
Gherarda, consort of the Count	soprano	Marinella Pennichi; Lorna Windsor
Conte della Rocca di Culagna	tenor	Gian Paolo Faggato; Fillipo Pina
Lorenzo, Mayor of Modena & father of Rennopia	bass	Fabio Previati
Manfredi, captain & Renoppia's lover	tenor	Luigi Petroni
Antibo, warrior & lover of Renoppia	tenor	Mauro Niccoletti; Fillipo Piccolo
Titta, doctor of laws & medicine	tenor	Fillipo Pina; Paolo Pellegrini
Amazon warriors, Modenese soldiers, Bolognese servants, Modenese councilors, trumpeters, citizens

== Synopsis ==
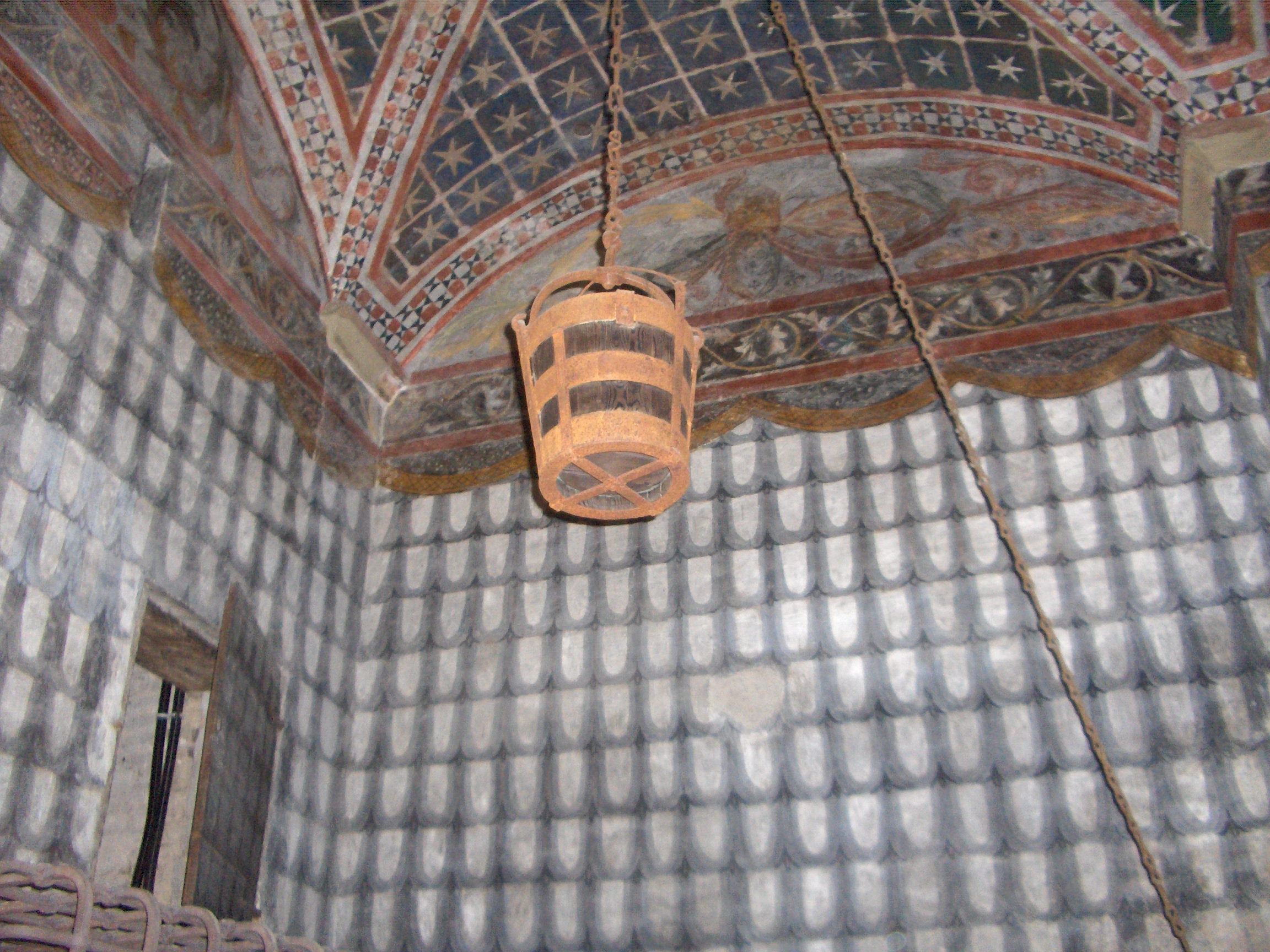
The stolen bucket in the Ghirlandina Tower in Modena.

Setting: Modena, 14th century

=== Act 1 ===
Renoppia (soprano), the daughter of the mayor, and Ghereda (soprano), the countess, await the return from battle of Manfredi and the Count. Manfredi (tenor), brave, and the Count (tenor), not so brave, have fought the forces of Bologna. Lorenzo (bass), the mayor, welcomes the returning army to the sounds of trumpeters. Manfredi displays a war trophy: a bucket taken from a Bolognese well. He gives the bucket to Renoppia and asks her to guard it. The ambassadors of Bologna, Antibo (tenor) and Titta (tenor), arrive seeking peace. They demand the return of the bucket and Renoppia and Ghereda as brides. The Count asks Titta to poison Ghereda. Ghereda overhearing this sings of her fidelity. Lorenzo and his council reject the peace offer and declare war. The characters exit to a military march.

=== Act 2 ===
Lorenzo and Antibo negotiate for an end to the conflict. Antibo proposes that Modena surrender to Bologna either the bucket or Renoppia. Lorenzo puts the offer to Manfredi, who is faced with a choice between love and honor. At a banquet the characters pass around a bowl of soup which is believed to be poisoned. The mayor enters and announces Bologna is attacking the city. The characters exit to defend Modena.

=== Act 3 ===
The war is to be decided by duels between Manfredi and Antibo and the Count and Titta. Manfredi wins but the Count fakes an injury and flees. Lorenzo declares negotiations at an end. The opera ends with the characters singing of how the taking of the bucket will be more famous in history than that of the Sabine women, Helen of Troy, and Persephone.

== Composition ==
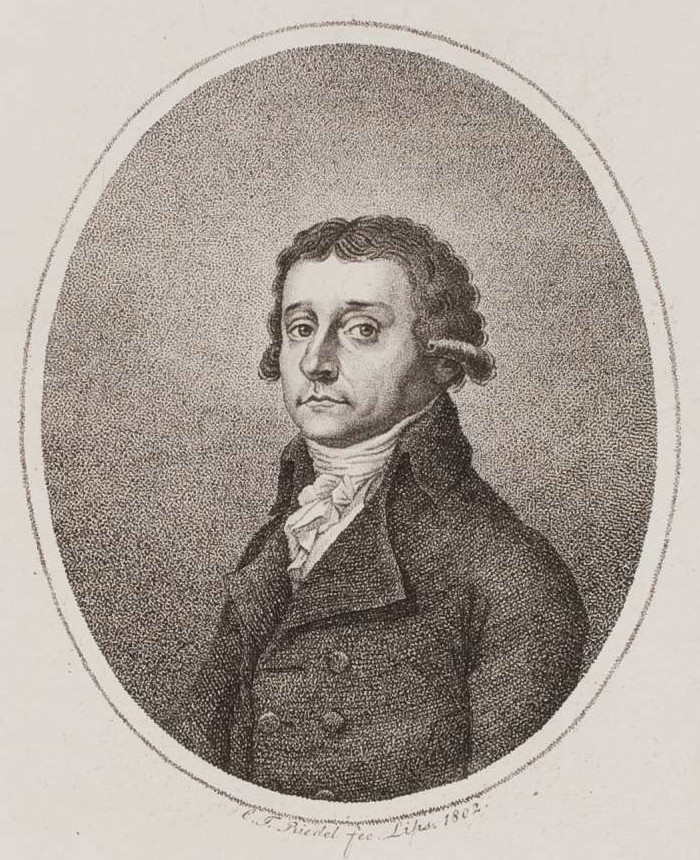
Antonio Salieri (1802)

Salieri was born near Venice in 1750. At fifteen, he came to Vienna in 1766 with the man who would become his mentor, Florian Leopold Gassmann, chamber composer to the Emperor Joseph II, Holy Roman Emperor.

Salieri's first opera, Le donne letterate (1770), was a collobation with Giovanni Gastone Boccherini, a dancer in the Vienna opera and brother of the composer Luigi. Salieri wrote of how their partnership began: "So Boccherini came to me one morning and, after greeting me, asked me without further preliminaries: 'Would you like to set to music a comic opera libretto that I have prepared?' I calmly answered: 'Why not?'" After Le donne letterate, four more operas came from the duo: L'amore innocente (1770), Don Chisciotte alle nozze di Gamace (1770), La fiera di Venezia (1772), and La secchia rapita (1772). During the 1770s and 1780s, opera buffa was enormously popular in Vienna, at least 128 works being produced.

"The element of parody is obvious from the title" of Secchia. It was the operas of Pietro Metastasio which were being parodied. Boccherini drew on seven of Metastasio's librettos: Ezio (1728), Semiramide riconosciuta (1729), Didone abbandonata (1724), Demetrio (1731), Antigono (1744), L'Olimpiade (1733), and La clemenza di Tito (1734). Metastasio, who lived in Vienna from 1730 until his death in 1782, was a teacher of Salieri. Salieri's score, wrote John A. Rice, "glor[ies] in and at the same time caricatur[es] the musical magnificence of serious opera".

In Tassoni's poem, "the ancient gods [were turned] into pathetic down-and-out characters" but Boccherini's libretto eliminated the gods and made the story "a harmless burlesque to which even Salieri contributed little that was original," wrote a modern biographer of the composer. That echoed Ignaz von Mosel's 1827 biography, published two years after Salieri's death, which said "the wretched libretto, in which an excellent comic dish has been reduced to the meanest and most tasteless prose there is the greatest blame for the fact that Salieri's genius could not, or did not, gain any greater momentum at this time."

Yet Karl von Zinzendorf, an Austrian government official and avid theatregoer, saw Secchia in Vienna in December 1772 with Robert Murray Keith, the British ambassador, Zizendorf writing in his diary that the opera's "seriousness is wonderfully combined with comedy". The critic for Opera, reviewing a 1990 production, thought Salieri brought "some elegance and rare subtlety to the succession of ridiculous situations . . . His ability to fit the formulas of opera seria to an absurd buffa plot is remarkable. The characters are made to express indignation, rage, despair, and patriotism in a grand, dignified manner, but what they all create is a comic effect." Throughout the comedy "is an undercurrent of sexual innuendo propelled by a series of double entendres". Boccherini wrote in the published libretto

Since Tassoni's poem is superficially nothing more than a parody of the Divine Poems of Homer, Petrarch, and Ariosto, we wanted to imitate the most famous and well-known heroic operas in the conduct of the scenes and in the expressions of the arias, with the intention of selecting thoughts capable of pleasing the public once again, even if masked by the playful style.

The score calls for two flutes, two oboes, two bassoons, two horns, two trumpets, timpani, and strings. Salieri's score was the first work to use three timpani. Each was tuned to a different key.

The opera opens with "the grandiose and slow introduction" of the overture. It is modeled after the overture to L'opera seria (1769), a comedy by Gassmann about the production of a serious opera in the style of Metastasio. Salieri, wrote the musicologist Timo Jouko Herrmann, "wittily reduces the musical-theatrical conventions of the period to absurdity and demands considerable effort from the fluent voices of his singers." There are four tenors in the cast when one of the parts might be expected in such an opera buffa to go to a castrato– but there were none available in Vienna when Salieri was composing.

== Performances ==
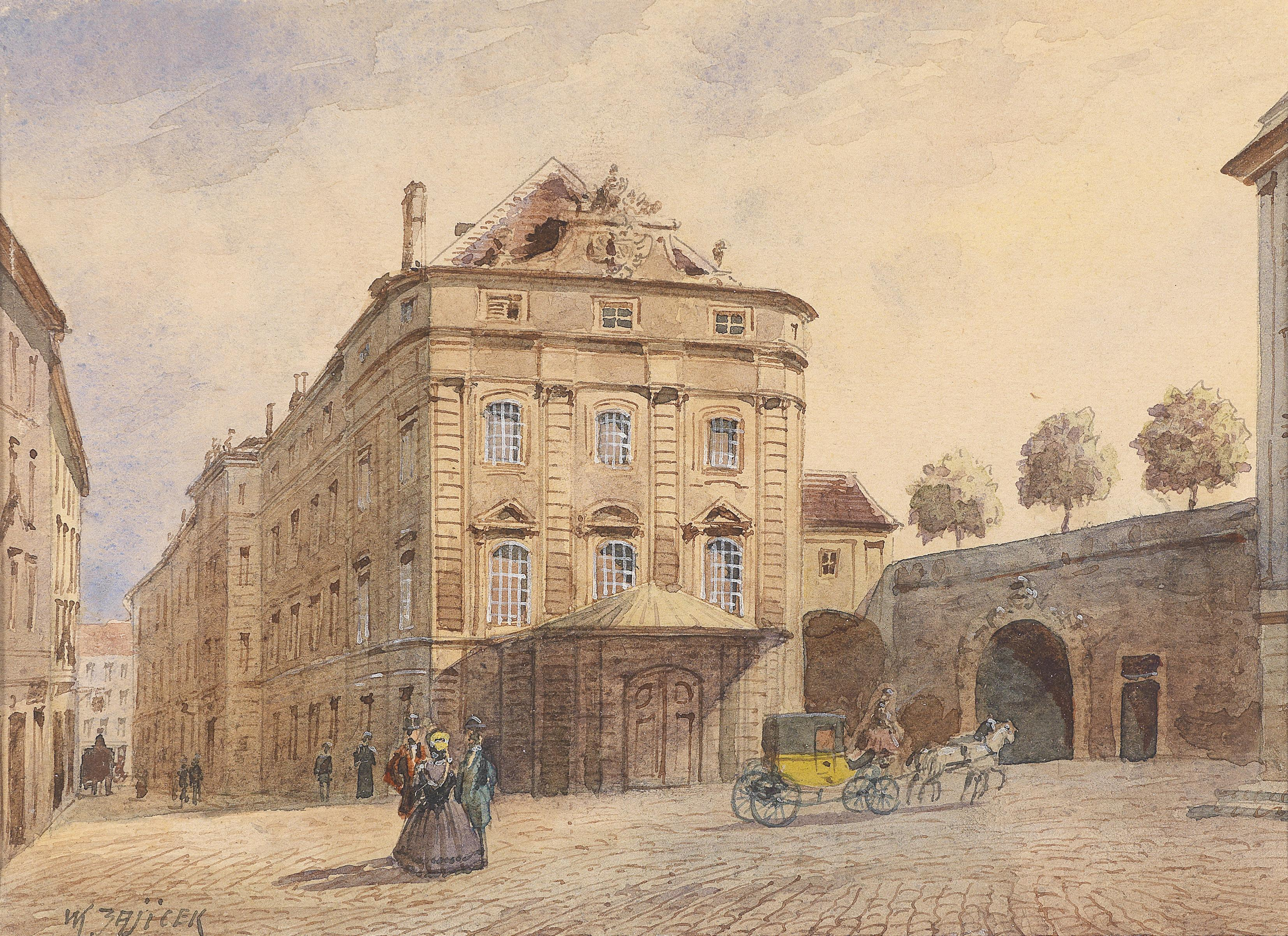
Theater am Kärntnertor, site of the premiere.

The first performance was at the Theater am Kärntnertor in Vienna on 21 October 1772. Salieri's operas were enormously popular during the 1772–73 Vienna season, his three operas that debuted in 1772 being "so successful as to totally dominate the schedule: 71 of 135 performance days in the 1772–73 season, more than half of all evenings, were devoted to these operas." The scholar Ingrid Schraffl noted they "compared with the simple standard ensembles of Italian opere buffe" with "unusually rich instrumentation [and] choruses," and contained "a mix, rare in imported operas, of comic and serious elements typical of the genre in the dramma eroicomico La secchia rapita, which was a striking and appealing special feature for the expert public." Secchia was performed 21 times during the 1772–1773 season. "Salieri’s operas were apparently considerably more successful than his teacher’s [Gassmann] works."

The opera was performed in Mannheim on 5 November 1774 for the name day of Charles Theodore, Elector Palatinate. It took the place of an opera that was to have been supplied by Johann Christian Bach. At Mannheim, it was performed with two ballets, La fête Marine, ou, la recontre imprévue and Les anans protegés par l'amour, both by Christian Cannabich, the kapellmeister of the elector's orchestra. Secchia was performed five times at Pillnitz Castle in Dresden in 1775; the first performance was on January 3.

Joseph Haydn had listed Secchia as a work considered for Eszterháza in the early 1780s but it does not appear that it was performed there. A performance of arias from the opera translated into German was given in Brno in 1784. In 1786, there were two performances in Prague. It appeared in Parma in 1787. The opera was performed at the Teatro Rognoni in Modena in 1787.

No performances since the 18th century were noted in a 1974 life of Salieri (Note: Swenson 1974 lists an 1816 performance at La Scala, but an 1818 catalog of Milanese theatre performances states the work performed that year was Niccolò Antonio Zingarelli's version of La secchia rapita, not Salieri's.) The only modern performance was at Modena's Teatro Comunale on 27 December 1990. Frans Brüggen was the conductor. The critic for the Italian newspaper l'Unità hailed Brüggen's "delightful vivacity and impeccable style".

== Score and libretto ==
The autograph score, in two volumes, is in the Austrian National Library in Vienna. A copy is in the Bavarian State Library in Munich, which came from the court of the Electoral Palatinate at Mannheim. Another copy, also originating at the court at Mannheim, is in the British Library, catalogued as Additional 16119. Other manuscripts are in Hungary in the National Széchényi Library in Budapest and in Italy in the Museo internazionale e biblioteca della musica in Bologna, the Conservatorio di Musica Luigi Cherubini in Florence, the Biblioteca Estense in Modena, and the Conservatorio di Musica S. Pietro a Majella in Naples.

Sheet music for the overture was published by Edizioni musicali Curci in 1960. The libretto was published by Josef von Kurzböck in Vienna in 1772. Librettos with the Italian and a German translation were published in Mannheim in 1774 and Dresden in 1776. The libretto was also published in Prague in 1776 and Modena in 1787.

== Adaptation ==
The German writer and dramatist Christian August Vulpius, the brother-in-law of Goethe, announced in 1787 that he had written an operetta entitled Das glückliche Abenteurer (The Happy Adventure) using Salieri's music for Secchia, but a copy of Vulpius's operetta could not be located when a bibliography of his work was compiled by the Goethe scholar Anton Kippenberg in 1926.

== Recordings ==
The Slovak Radio Symphony Orchestra recorded the overture to La secchia rapita for the compact disc Salieri: Overtures, initially released in 1994 on the Marco Polo Records label and rereleased in 2000 on its sister label Naxos Records. A review in American Record Guide noted "the witty writing for the woodwinds in the curtain-raiser for the opera buffa La Secchia Rapita—or for that matter the rather Gluckian character of the opening and closing sections."

The soprano Cecilia Bartoli in 2003 released The Salieri Album, which include two arias from Secchia, "Questo guajo mancava...Son qual lacera tartana" and "No, non cacillera...Suelle mi temple". "I believe that Salieri's music is full of emotion, which is the mark of a great composer", Bartoli said. The review in The Opera Quarterly said "The disc opens auspiciously with a high-charged performance of a simile aria from the 1772 Secchia rapita, which brings Bartoli's skill with rapid fioriture immediately to the fore in music that compares a character's emotional turmoil to a boat on a storm-tossed sea."

== See also ==
- Niccolò Antonio Zingarelli, composer of the 1793 opera La secchia rapita.
- Francesco Bianchi, composer of the 1794 opera La secchia rapita.
- Gialdino Gialdini, composer of the 1872 opera La secchia rapita.
- Giulio Ricordi, composer of the 1910 opera La secchia rapita.
