= Battle of Zappolino =

Battle of the War of the Oaken Bucket

- Part of the War of the Bucket within the second phase of the Wars of the Guelphs and Ghibellines
Date	15 November 1325
Location	near Zappolino, Metropolitan City of Bologna, present-day Italy 44°30′N 11°05′E
Result	Modenese victory

Belligerents
Modena (Ghibelline)	Bologna (Guelph)

Commanders and leaders
Passerino dei Bonacolsi; Azzone Visconti; Rinaldo II d'Este; Lorenzo Scotti	Fulcieri da Calboli; Malatestino Malatesta; Albertino Boschetti

Strength
2,000 cavalry 5,000 infantry	2,000 cavalry 30,000 infantry

Casualties and losses
c. 500 killed or wounded	c. 2,500 killed or wounded

The Battle of Zappolino, the only battle of the War of the Oaken Bucket, was fought in November 1325 between forces representing the Italian towns of Bologna and Modena, an incident in the series of raids and reprisals between the two cities that were part of the larger conflicts of Guelphs and Ghibellines. The Modenese were victorious. Though many clashes between Guelphs and Ghibellines loomed larger to contemporaries than to historians, the unusually-large encounter involved 4,000 estimated cavalry and some 35,000 foot soldiers, and 2,000 men lost their lives. The location of the battle, at the foot of a hill just outside the castle walls, is now a frazione of the municipality of Castello di Serravalle, Emilia-Romagna.

== Setting ==
Their boundaries had been set by Frederick II, Holy Roman Emperor a century earlier, but competitive friction along their mutual marches between Ghibelline Modena, with the Emperor as a patron, and Guelph Bologna, with the Pope as a patron, had flared over decades. In 1296, the Bolognese invaded the Modenese lands of Bazzano and Savigno, with the support of Pope Boniface VIII, who recognized in 1298 Guelf possession of the border castles. Within the two cities, the situation was complicated by numbers of exiles and divided loyalties. In Modena, the struggle for power after the death of Obizzo II d'Este, which divided his sons' friends into hostile camps, was resolved in favor of Azzo VIII, who confronted Bologna partly to bolster his lukewarm reception by his own city's nobles. His elected successor, the Mantuan Passerino Bonacolsi, the agent of Louis of Bavaria, King of the Romans, pursued the embittered war politics, with Parma, Reggio and Modena also under his power. John XXII declared him a rebel against the Church and granted indulgences as befitted a Crusader to any who could harm his person or his possessions.

In the months before the battle, border clashes intensified. In July, the Bolognese entered the Modenese territory and laid waste the fields in the section "between the canals" by fire and sword. In August, a Bolognese rabble led by their podestà, spent two weeks ravaging the lands of Modena. In September, Mantua took its turn, and at the end of that month, the strategic Bolognese rocca of Monteveglio was betrayed to Modena by malcontents. Two renegade castellans were beheaded.

== Battle ==
As the Bolognese chronicler Matteo Griffoni tells it, the militia and the rabble of Bologna headed by their podestà, aided by allies from Florence and Romagna, besieged the fortress of Monteveglio. Quickly, an opposing force arrived, headed by Cangrande della Scala, the leader of the Ghibelline faction, Azzone Visconti of Milan, with many of his professional German troops, and Rinaldo, marchese of Ferrara, leading forces of Modena, Mantua and Ferrara. Cangrande soon departed for Verona, but the Bolognese took for their captain the condottiero Malatesta, lord of Rimini.

The battle took place 15 November 1325 around sunset. The Bolognese had 30,000 foot soldiers, who would have been haphazardly armed, and 2500 horsemen facing 2800 horsemen on the Modenese side, who were supported by 5000 foot soldiers. Bonacolsi devised a plan to feign a river crossing in an effort to distract part of the Bolognese forces. They put this tactic in action a day prior to the main battle at Zappolino. During the cover of night the Modenese headed south to the modern town of Marano sul Panaro. They crossed the river, and after a short skirmish with a Bolognese vanguard began to march towards Zappolino. The Bolognese realizing they had fallen for a trap began to recall the men that had been sent to the north. The Modenese were positioned close to where the town of Ziribega stands today, while the Bolognese were positioned on a slope coming down from the hill that the fortress was located on. Bonacolsi realized that if he did not strike now while the Bolognese were unorganized it would be far more difficult to attain victory. The Modenese began an attack on the Bolognese lines, and soon heavy fighting erupted. Bonacolsi sent his cavalry around the side, in order to attack the Bolognese from behind.

The battle was over by nightfall. Within a couple of hours, the Bolognese were routed. The Modenese advanced to the very walls of Bologna and destroyed the castles of Crespellano, Zola, Samoggia, Anzola, Castelfranco, Piumazzo and the chiusa del Reno near Casalecchio, which diverted the river towards the city. They did not attempt a siege of the city but scornfully organized a palio outside the very gates of the city ad æternam memoriam præmissorum et æternam Bononiensium scandalum, "to the eternal memory of those sent out on the expedition and the eternal shame of Bologna", and then returned to Modena brandishing a bucket taken from a well outside Porta San Felice; twenty-six captured notables of Bologna were incarcerated for the next eleven weeks in Modena.

== Aftermath ==
David Abulafia in The New Cambridge Medieval History asserts, "Ghibelline influence in the region was consolidated by a victory at Zappolino". However, peace agreements in the following January returned Monteveglio and the other castles to Bologna, a return locally to status quo ante, which was probably paid for privately as ransom with a coin in the hands of Passerino Bonacolsi. At Bologna, the coat of arms of Pope John XXII was displayed in conjunction with those of Robert d'Anjou, showing that the old alliance of the Avignon papacy and the house of Anjou was still viable in some eyes.

The battle is also famous for the wooden bucket that the Modenese took as spoils from the Bolognesi. Though it is not mentioned by Griffoni, the unusual booty was venerated in Modena in remembrance of the victory. The history of the bucket was told in Alessandro Tassoni's satirical poem La secchia rapita (1614–15, published in Paris, 1622). It was still seen in the basement of the Torre della Ghirlandina in 1911.
