= La secchia rapita =

1622 poem by Alessandro Tassoni

- by Alessandro Tassoni
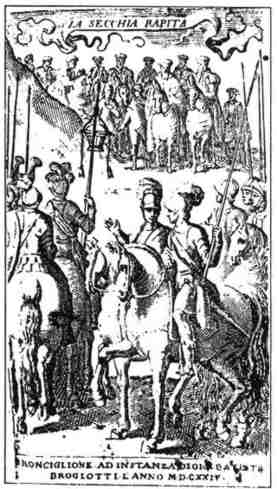
- Cover of the second edition of La Secchia rapita by Tassoni, published at Ronciglione in 1624
- Translator: John Ozell; James Atkinson
- Written: 1614–1617
- First published in: 1622, with revisions in 1624 and 1630
- Country: Duchy of Modena
- Language: Italian
- Subject: War of the Bucket
- Genre: mock-heroic epic poem
- Form: epic poem of 12 cantos
- Meter: ottava rima
- Rhyme scheme: abababcc
- Publication date: 1622, 1624, 1630
- Published in English: 1714, 1825
- Media type: print: hardback

La Secchia Rapita (The Stolen Bucket or The Rape of the Bucket (Note: Here the word "rape" is used in the archaic meaning of "to snatch", "to plunder")) is a mock-heroic epic poem by Alessandro Tassoni, first published in 1622. Later successful mock-heroic works in French and English were written on the same plan.

== Background ==
The invention of the heroic-comic poem in the Baroque period is usually ascribed to Alessandro Tassoni who, in 1622, published in Paris a poem entitled La Secchia Rapita. Written in ottava rima, his "poema eroicomico" consists of twelve substantial cantos and deals with the regional rivalry between Ghibelline Modena and Guelph Bologna in the 14th century. To avoid giving offence in a still divided Italy, the book was first published from Paris under the name of Androvinci Melisone, but was soon afterwards reprinted in Venice with illustrations by Gasparo Salviani, and with the author's real name.

The subject of Tassoni's poem was the war which the inhabitants of Modena declared against those of Bologna, on the refusal of the latter to restore to them some towns which had been occupied ever since the time of the Emperor Frederick II. The author mischievously made use of a popular tradition, according to which it was believed that a certain wooden bucket, kept in the treasury of Modena cathedral, came from Bologna, and that it had been forcibly taken away by the Modenese. Every episode of the poem, though beginning in the epic manner, ends in some hilarious absurdity.

The poem twice received operatic treatment under its original title. The first was Antonio Salieri's comic three-act La secchia rapita, first performed in Vienna in 1772. Then in 1910 the work was reinterpreted as an operetta by Giulio Ricordi under his musical pseudonym Jules Burgmein.

== The battle of the books ==
Giovanni Mario Crescimbeni, in his Istoria della Volgar Poesia (1698), records his doubt whether the invention of the heroicomic poem ought to be ascribed to Tassoni, but instead to Francesco Bracciolini. Though the latter's Lo Scherno degli Dei (The Mockery of the Gods) was printed four years after La Secchia, he claimed in the epistle prefixed to it that he had written his some years earlier. Crescimbeni adds that, because Tassoni had severely ridiculed the Bolognese, Bartolomeo Bocchini (1604-1648/53), to revenge his countrymen, published from Venice in 1641 a poem in the same vein with the title Le Pazzie dei Savi (The Madness of the Wise), or alternatively the Lambertaccio, in which the Modenese are spoken of with contempt.

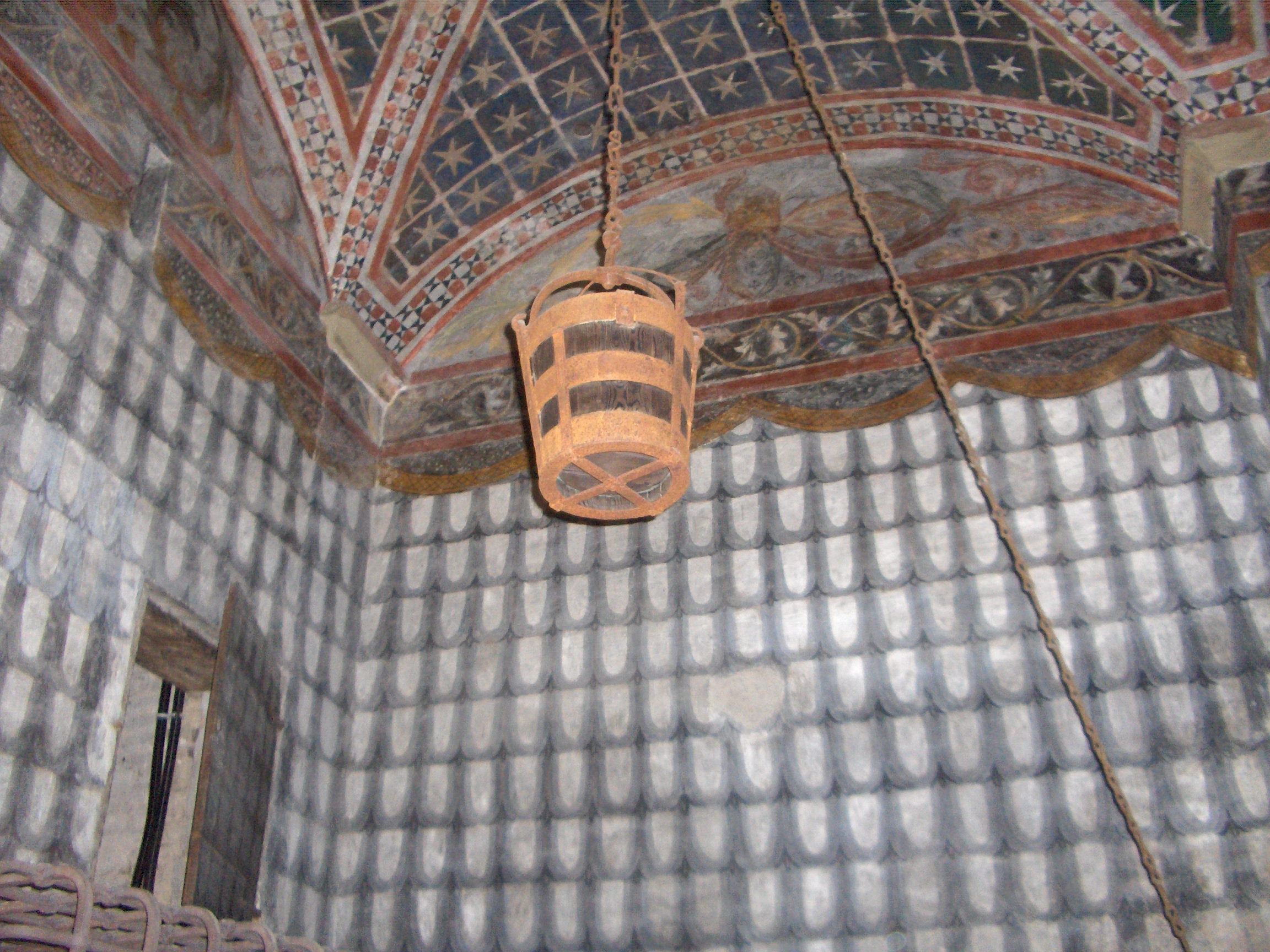
The stolen bucket, inside the Ghirlandina Tower

Tassoni's mock-heroic manner was also found a fruitful model by Boileau, whose Le Lutrin (The Lectern, 1674–83) recounts a feud between the priest and the choirmaster of a French church. There the priest tries to position a reading-desk so as to obscure his rival from the sight of the congregation in a conflict that ends with champions of both sides gathering in a bookstore to pelt each other with books.

Boileau's work has been seen as the model for Alexander Pope's The Rape of the Lock. Pope was also familiar with John Ozell's English-language translation (made in 1710) of Tassoni's poem, which was originally entitled The Trophy Bucket. It has been surmised that this translation of La Secchia Rapita may have influenced Pope, and might conceivably have served as a more direct model for The Rape of the Lock. Following the public acclaim of Pope's five-canto version of The Rape of the Lock in 1714 (a two-canto version had been published anonymously in 1712), in 1715, Ozell's publisher took the opportunity to retitle the translation as The Rape of the Bucket.

In 1825 the linguist James Atkinson published an ottava rima translation of the whole of Tassoni's poem. In his introduction, he acknowledged the general assumption that the poem is known "as the model upon which the Rape of the Lock of Pope, and the Lutrin of Boileau are conceived", but opined that "there is little of similarity among them. The Secchia Rapita indeed differs essentially from the Rape of the Lock, both in spirit, and execution. There is nothing in the latter that can be compared with the humour of the former, or with the admirably grotesque pictures with which it abounds".
