= Modena Cathedral =

Cathedral in Emilia-Romagna, Italy

Metropolitan Cathedral of Saint Mary of the Assumption and Saint Geminianus Cattedrale Metropolitana di Santa Maria Assunta e San Geminiano (in Italian)
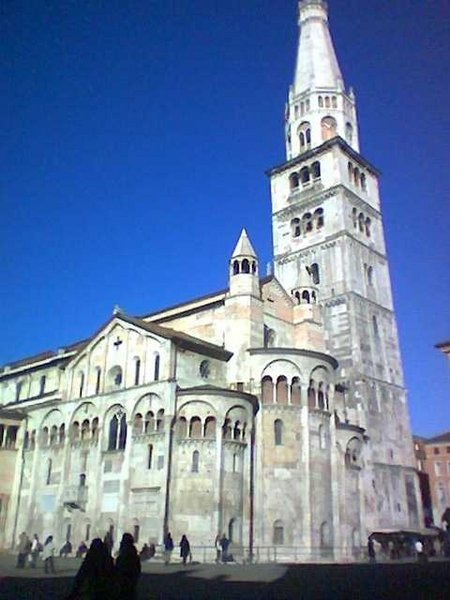
- The Cathedral with the Ghirlandina

Religion
- Affiliation: Roman Catholic
- Province: Archdiocese of Modena-Nonantola
- Rite: Roman
- Leadership: Archbishop Erio Castellucci, Emeritus Bishop Benito Cocchi
- Year consecrated: 1184

Location
- Location: Modena, Italy
- Interactive map of Metropolitan Cathedral of Saint Mary of the Assumption and Saint Geminianus; Cattedrale Metropolitana di Santa Maria Assunta e San Geminiano (in Italian)
- Coordinates: 44°38′46.5″N 10°55′32.4″E

Architecture
- Architects: Lanfranco, Anselmo da Campione
- Style: Romanesque
- Groundbreaking: 1099
- Completed: 1319
- UNESCO World Heritage Site
- Official name: Cathedral, Torre Civica and Piazza Grande, Modena
- Type: Cultural
- Criteria: i, ii, iii, vi
- Designated: 1997 (21st session)
- Reference no.: 827
- State Party: Italy
- Region: Europe and North America

Modena Cathedral (Italian: Cattedrale Metropolitana di Santa Maria Assunta e San Geminiano but colloquially known as simply Duomo di Modena) is a Roman Catholic cathedral in Modena, Italy, dedicated to the Assumption of the Virgin Mary and Saint Geminianus. Formerly the seat of the Diocese, later Archdiocese, of Modena, it has been since 1986 the archiepiscopal seat of the Archdiocese of Modena-Nonantola. Consecrated in 1184, it is an important Romanesque building in Europe, and along with its bell tower, the Torre della Ghirlandina, is designated as a World Heritage Site.

== History ==
Since the 5th century, two churches had existed on the site of the present cathedral: the discovery of the burial site of Saint Geminianus, Modena's patron saint, led to the destruction of those churches and building of this cathedral by 1099. The initial design and direction was provided by an architect known as Lanfranco, about whom little else is known. The Saint's remains are still exhibited in the cathedral's crypt. The present cathedral was consecrated by Pope Lucius III on July 12, 1184. This is also the place where Modena kept Bologna's Bucket from the War of the Bucket.

== Embellishment ==
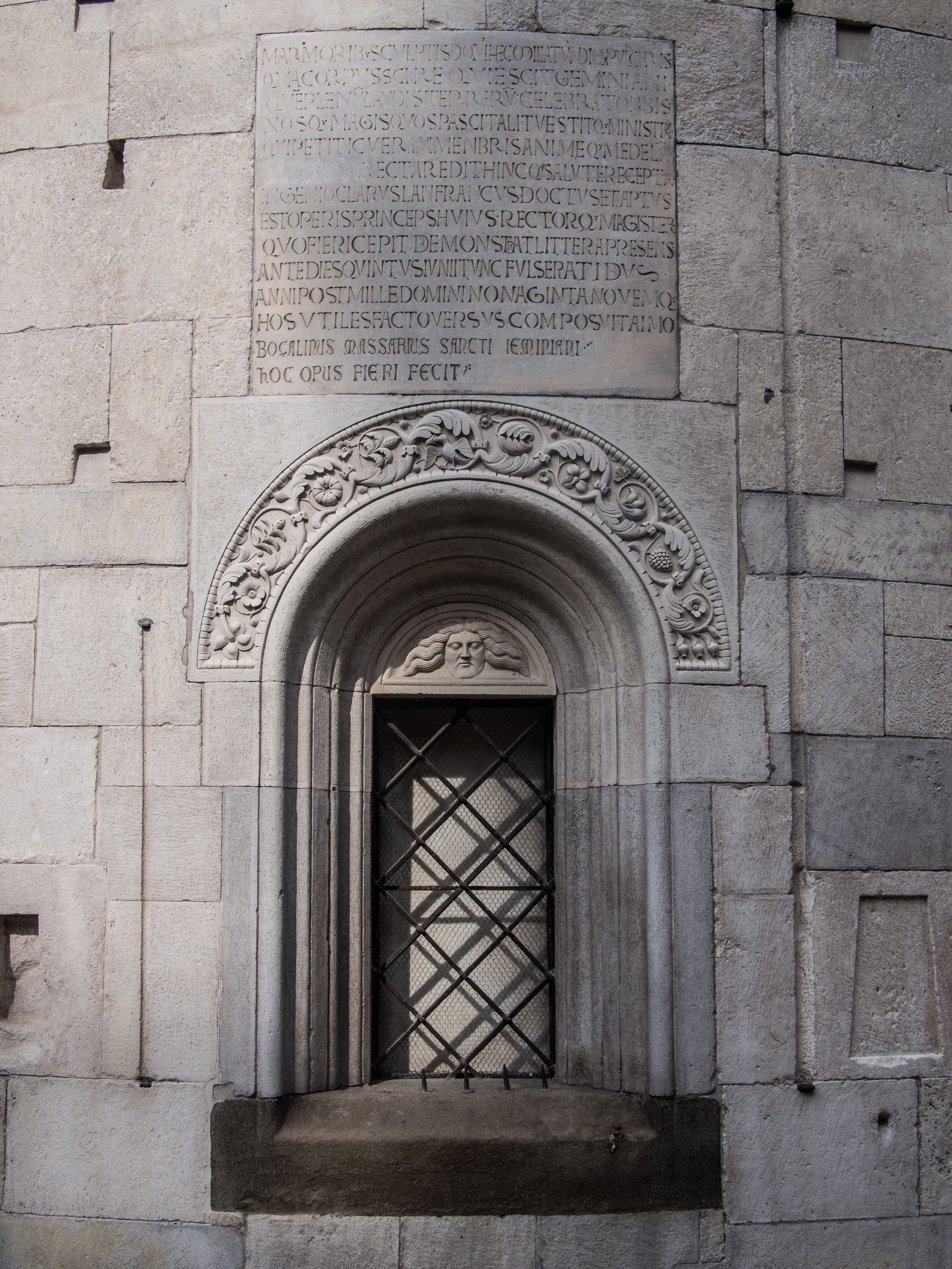
Inscription on the apse.

After Lanfranco's work, the cathedral was embellished by Anselmo da Campione and his heirs, the so-called "Campionese-masters". The current façade therefore exhibits different styles. The majestic rose-window was added by Anselmo in the 13th century, while the two lions supporting the entrance's columns date to Roman times, probably discovered while digging the foundations.

== Façade ==
The façade also has notable reliefs by Wiligelmus, a contemporary of Lanfranco; these include portraits of prophets and patriarchs, and most of all the Biblical Stories, a masterpiece of Romanesque sculpture. The scholars have pointed out the splendid achievements in the creation of Adam and Eve, the original sin and the story of Noah.

The side portals are also noteworthy. On the Piazza Grande, the porta regia di piazza (piazza portal), also by the campionesi, and the porta dei principi (princes' portal), decorated with a relief depicting episodes of the life of Saint Geminianus, by a pupil of Wiligelmus. On the northern side is the porta della pescheria (fish market portal), with reliefs inspired by the cycle of the twelve months on the doorposts, and tales from the Breton Cycle of King Arthur on the archivolt.

== Interiors ==
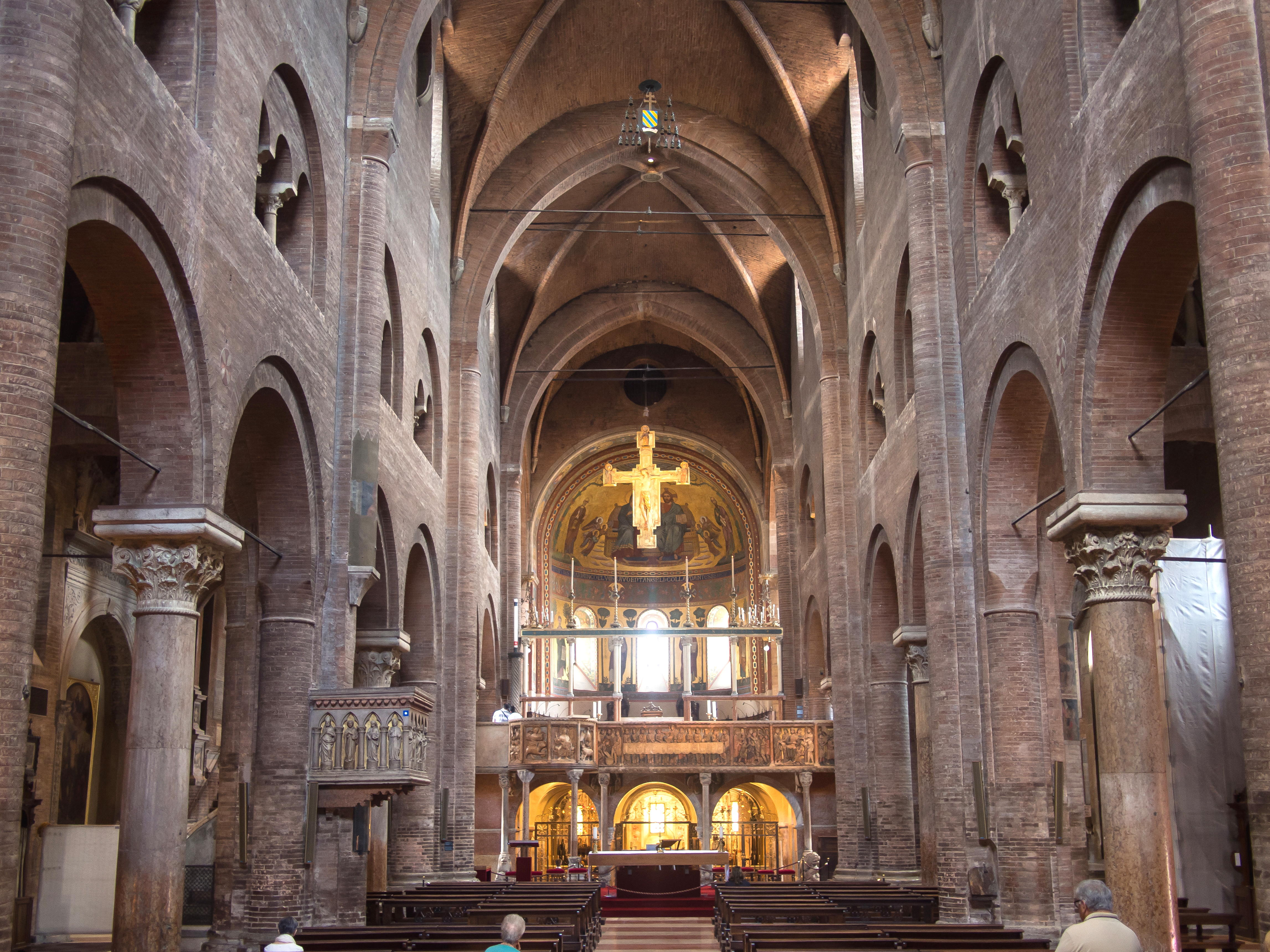

The interior is of classic cathedral design. Between the nave and the crypt is a marble parapet by Anselmo da Campione portraying the Passion of Christ, including the Last Supper. The pulpit is by Arrigo da Campione, decorated with small terracotta statues. Notable also the wood crucifix from the 14th century.

The Duomo houses also the nativity scenes by two great Modenese artistis: Antonio Begarelli's one (1527) and, in the crypt, Guido Mazzoni's one (1480), also known as the Madonna della Pappa ("Madonna of the Pap").

The Torre della Ghirlandina is annexed to the church.

The funeral of the late famed tenor Luciano Pavarotti, a native of Modena, was held in the cathedral.

== Porta della Pescheria ==
The cathedral's north portal, known as the Porta della Pescheria, features high relief carvings of secular scenes on the marble archivolt and lintel. The carvings on the archivolt are notable for depicting a very early Arthurian scene.

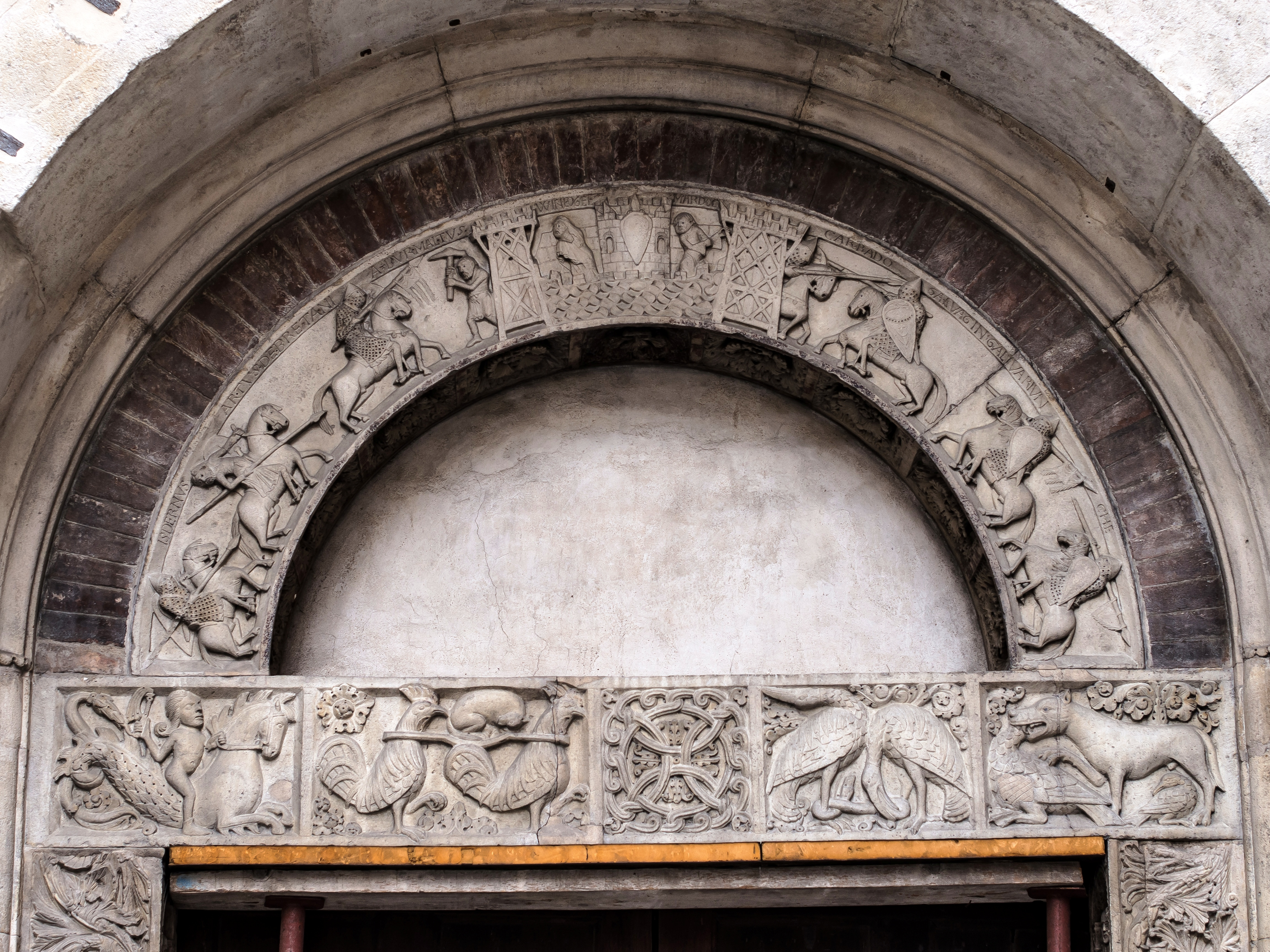
Upper part of the Porta della Pescheria.

The lintel carvings include a cross, birds, animals, and a man riding a hippocamp. The archivolt carving, dubbed the "Modena Archivolt" in Arthurian circles, includes inscriptions identifying the figures as Arthurian characters and sets them in a scene which has various correspondences in Arthurian literature. It is possibly the earliest monumental sculpture to feature the Arthurian legend. The sculptor has been dubbed the "Arthur Master", and critics note that while his inspiration outshines his skill he faithfully captures realistic details in architecture and dress. The date of the piece and the artist's source have been debated vigorously. Roger Sherman Loomis argued for a date at the beginning of the 12th century, which would place the carving decades earlier than the earliest written Arthurian romances on the continent. However, other evidence points to a date no earlier than 1120, and the later work of Jacques Stiennon and Rita Lejeune suggests a date between 1120 and 1140.

At the center of the Modena Archivolt image is a castle defended by two towers, inside of which are two figures identified as "Mardoc" and "Winlogee". The left tower is defended by a pickaxe-wielding man named "Burmaltus", who faces off against Artus de Bretania (King Arthur), Isdernus (most likely Yder), and another unnamed knight, who all bear their lances against him. On the other side, the knight "Carrado" spars with "Galvagin" (probably Gawain), while "Che" (Kay) and "Galvariun" (perhaps Galeshin) approach with their lances at their shoulders.

"Winlogee" most likely corresponds to Arthur's wife, Guinevere. Loomis suggested the names derived from Breton; "Winlogee" is similar to the Breton name Wenlowen, and Guinevere's name is rendered as the related Gwendoloena in the Latin romance De Ortu Waluuanii. The Abduction of Guinevere is a very popular and ancient element of the Arthurian legend, first appearing in written form in Caradoc of Llancarfan's mid-12th-century Life of Gildas. This version describes Arthur's queen as being kidnapped by King Melwas of the Summer Country and taken to Glastonbury; Arthur only recovers her with the help of Saint Gildas. Later versions call the kidnapper Meleagant and name the queen's lover Lancelot, rather than Arthur himself, as her rescuer. Interesting in the context of the Modena Archivolt is the shadowy early tradition in which the character known as Yder, Ider, or some variant was the queen's lover and rescuer. This tradition is mostly lost but is mentioned in Thomas of Britain's Tristan and survives, in greatly manipulated form, in other romances, the most important of which is Yder. One such romance, Durmart le Galois, includes a scene in which Ydier participates in a rescue of Guinevere, and rides unarmed, as Isdernus does on the Modena Archivolt.

The knight Galvagin, the only one with a decorated shield, likely corresponds to Gawain, the hero of many romances. Gawain fights with a knight named Carados of the Dolorous Tower in the Vulgate Cycle (Lancelot-Grail) and Thomas Malory's Le Morte d'Arthur, based on the Vulgate. Further correspondences with material in the Vulgate also occur: notably, the Vulgate includes a scene in which Arthur, his nephew Galeshin, and his seneschal Kay attack Carados of the Dolorous Tower; the names of Arthur's companions are similar to the "Che" and "Galvariun" who approach Gawain on the Modena Archivolt. Loomis argued that the Archivolt scene corresponds to the Vulgate version of Guinevere's abduction, and that in an early version Gawain may have been the rescuer rather than Lancelot. Others have argued that the Modena image depicts the lost romance of Yder, or else the early stock version in which Arthur himself was the rescuer. Some others have argued that the image is not of Arthurian origin at all, though this is minority opinion.

== Gallery ==
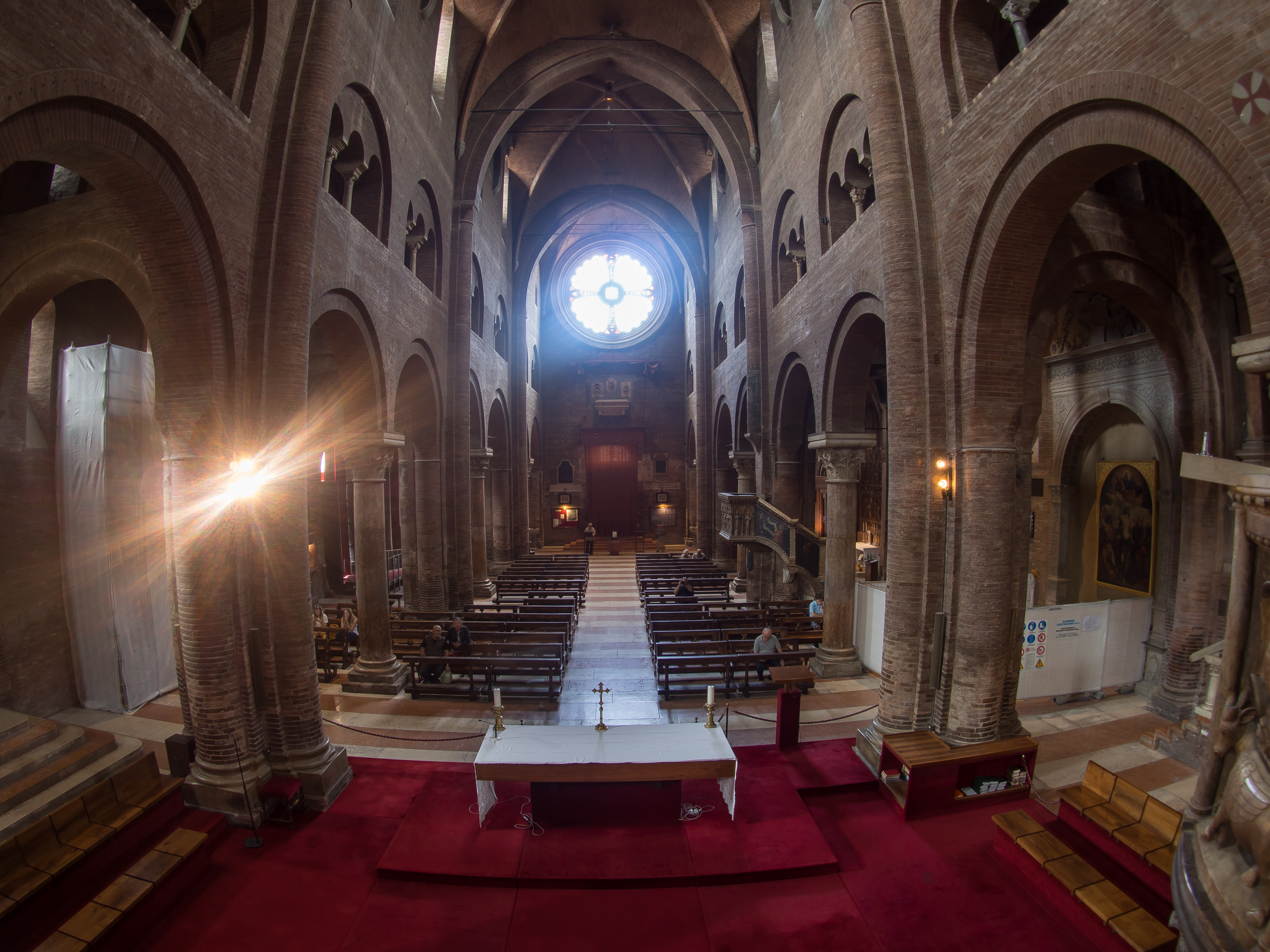
Inside view

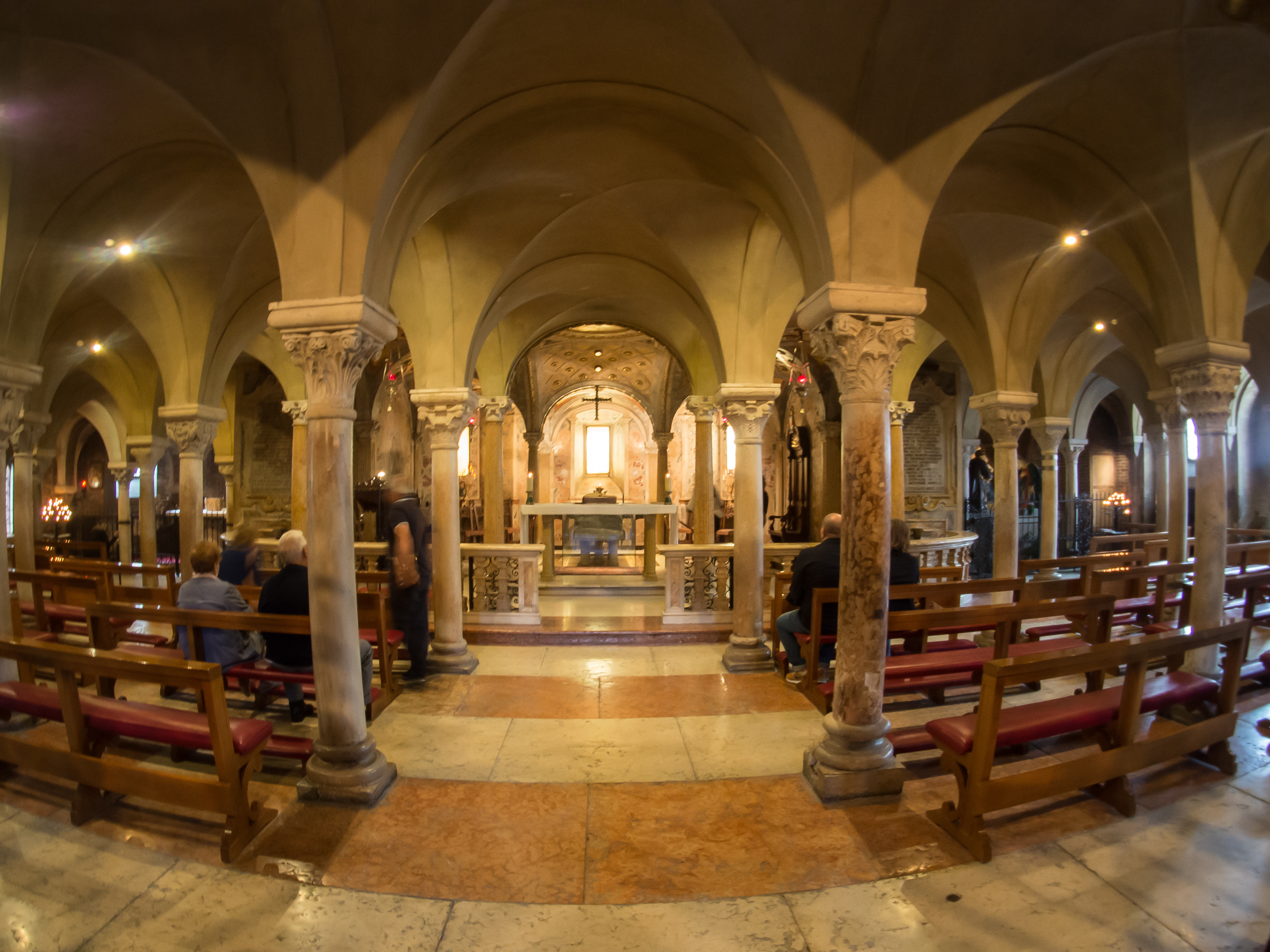
The crypt

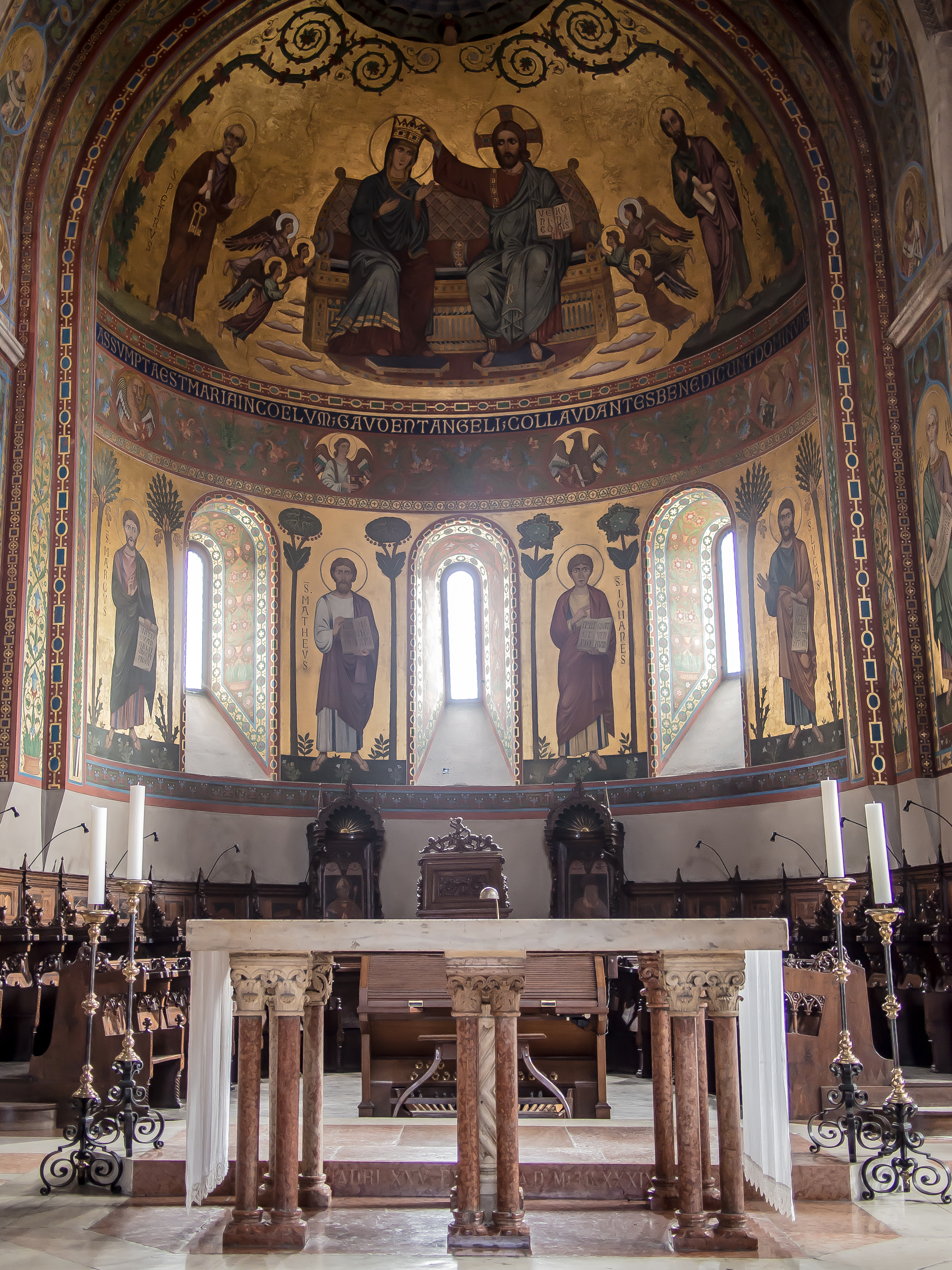
The Apse

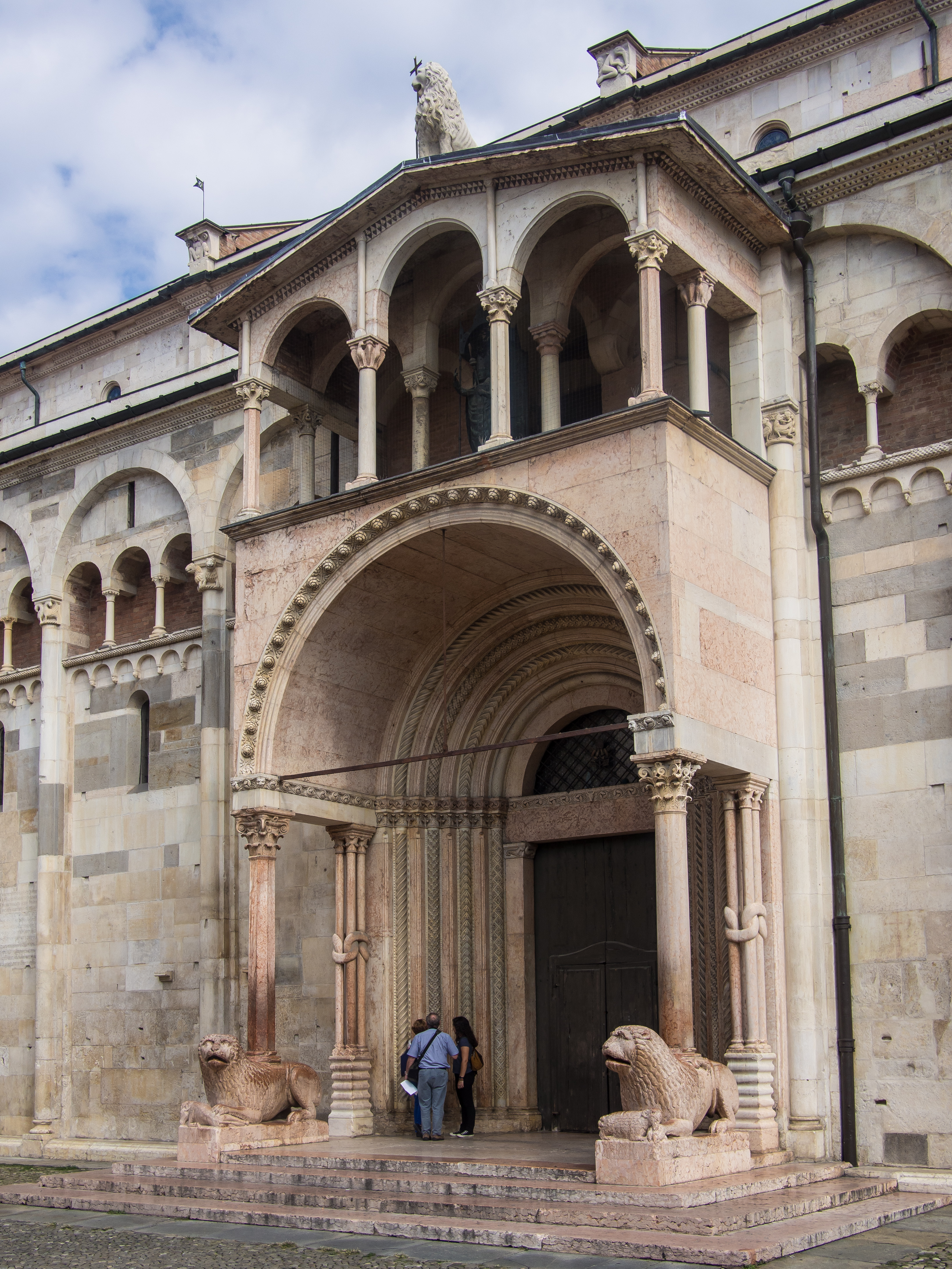
Piazza portal

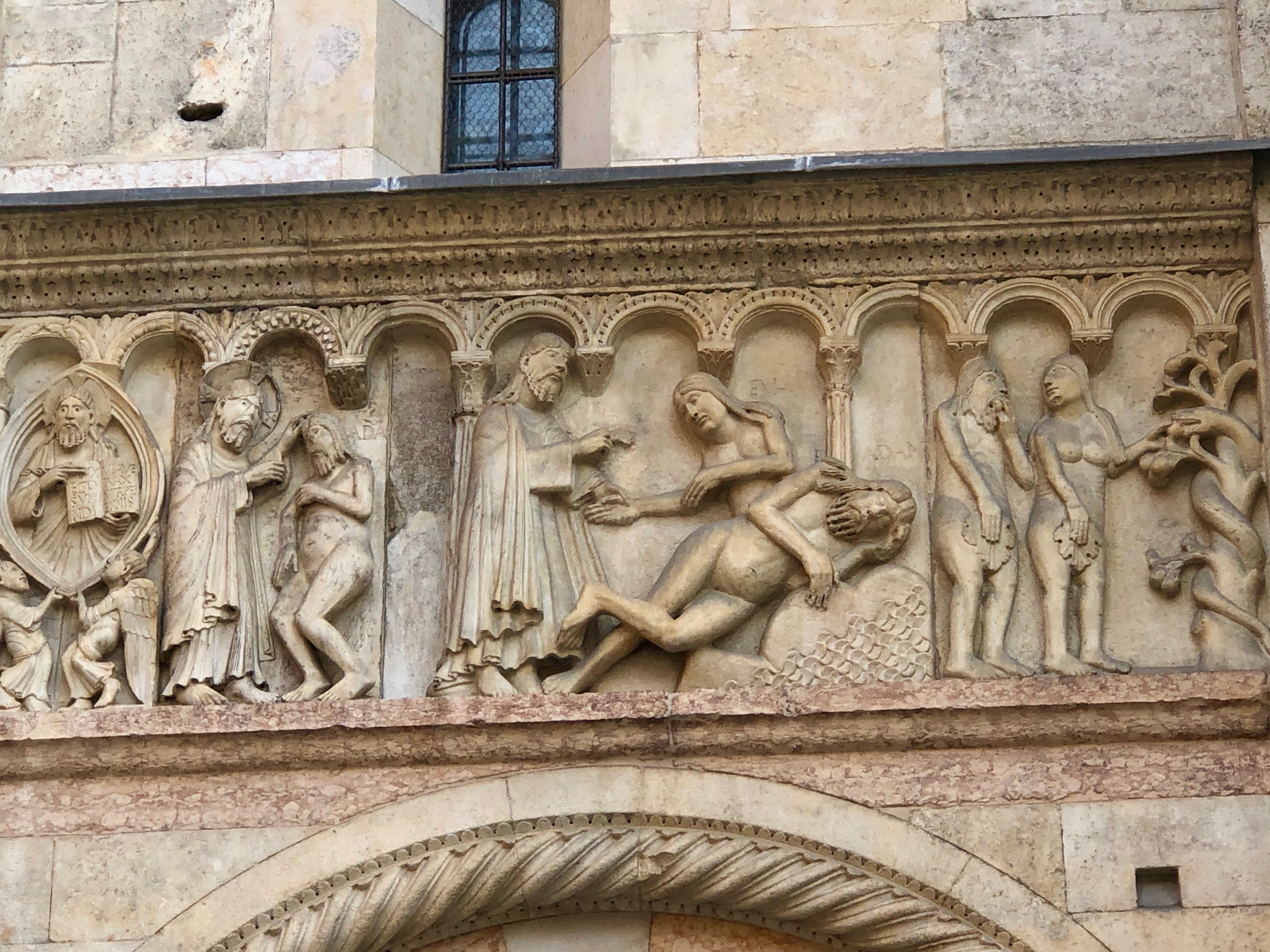
West façade

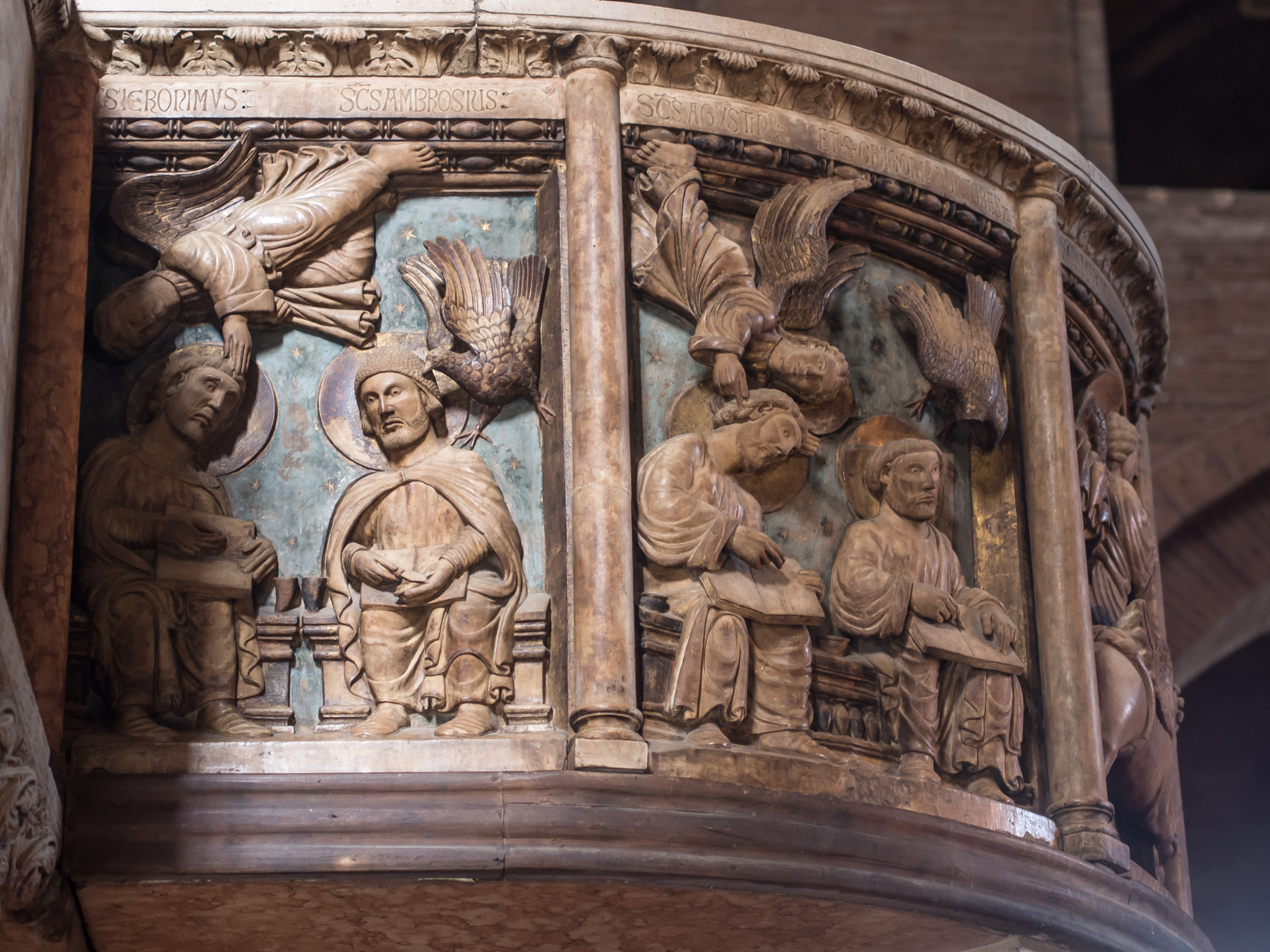
Detail pulpit

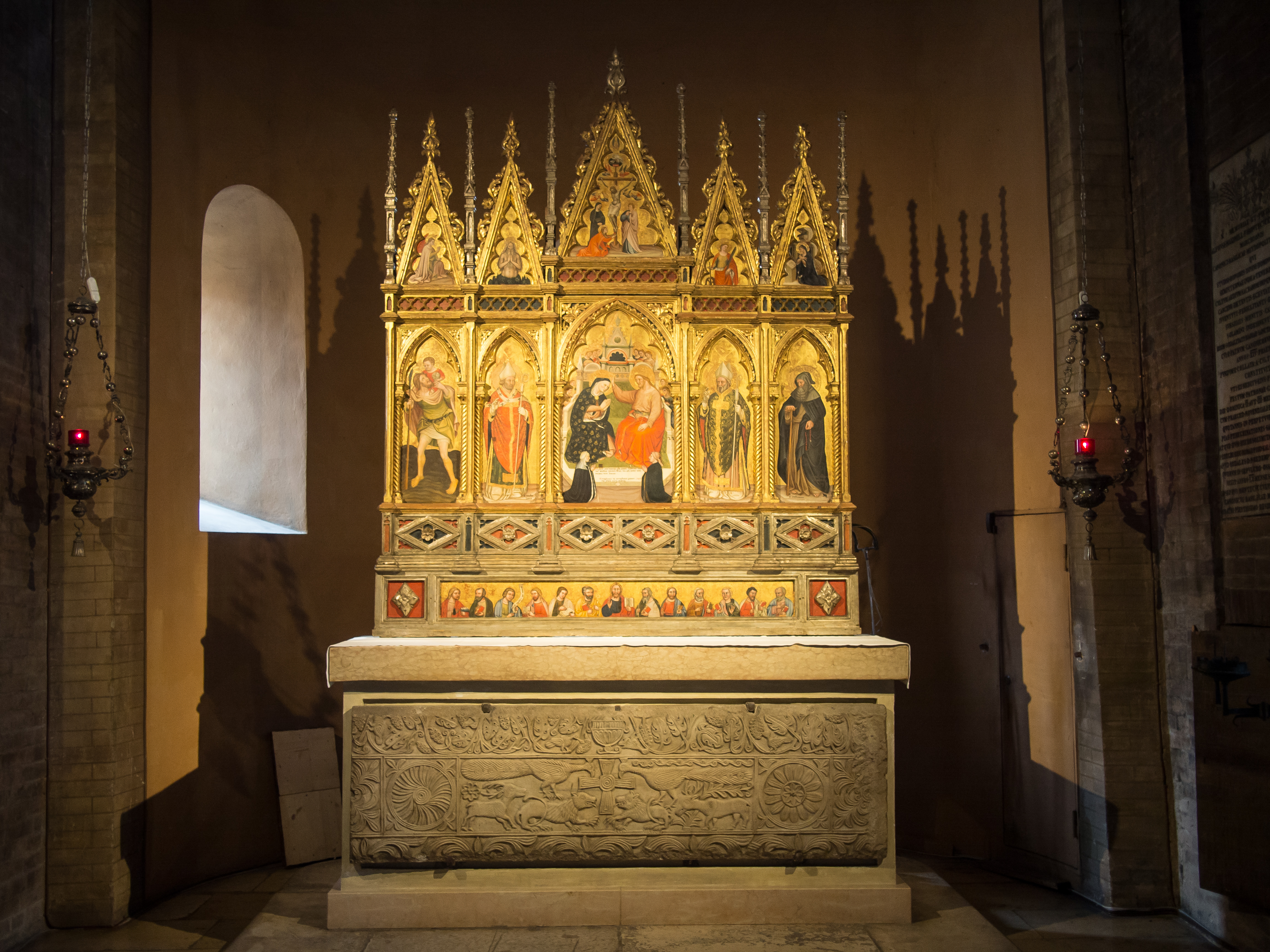
Detail sarcophagus
