= War of the Bucket =

War between two Italian city states (Bologna and Modena) in 1325

- Part of the second phase of the Guelph–Ghibelline conflict
| Date | 1325 |
| Location | Emilia-Romagna, northern Italy |
| Result | Modenese victory |

Belligerents
| Bologna (Guelph) | Modena (Ghibelline) |

Commanders and leaders
| Fulcieri da Calboli | Passerino dei Bonacolsi |

Strength
| 32,000 (at Zappolino) | 7,000 (at Zappolino) |

Casualties and losses
| c. 2,500 killed or wounded | c. 500 killed or wounded |

The War of the (Oaken) Bucket (Italian: Guerra della secchia rapita) was fought in 1325 between the rival city-states of Bologna and Modena. It took place in the region of Emilia-Romagna, in northern Italy. The war was an episode in the over 300-year-long struggle between Guelphs and Ghibellines. Modena won the Battle of Zappolino, the only battle of the war.

A common myth surrounding the War of the Bucket is that it was caused by the Modenese stealing a bucket from a Bolognese well. However, that is mostly incorrect, as the bucket was, according to one source, taken as a trophy by the Modenese after the war—in fact, war was declared because Modena had captured the Bolognese castle of Monteveglio.

== Background ==
From the late Middle Ages to the Renaissance, northern Italy was divided between factions supporting the rival political claims of the Holy Roman Emperor ("Ghibellines") and the Pope ("Guelphs"). Modena was Ghibelline; Bologna was Guelph. The political difference exacerbated the natural conflicts over border territories.

In 1176, Frederick Barbarossa was defeated at the Battle of Legnano by the Lombard League, which supported Pope Alexander III. That was the start of a protracted period of conflict in Medieval Italy between the Guelphs and Ghibellines. The two opposing factions started war against each other. The town of Modena was a staunch supporter of the Holy Roman Empire and pledged to be a Ghibelline city. The northern city of Bologna was a Guelph city and was led by the Popes because it supported them.

In 1296, Bologna seized Bazzano and Savigno from Modena. Pope Boniface VIII confirmed Bologna's title that same year.

Azzo VIII d'Este, Marquis of Ferrara controlled Modena from 1293 to 1308 and confronted Bologna partly to bolster his lukewarm support among Modena's nobles. His elected successor, the Mantuan Passerino Bonacolsi, was an agent of Emperor Louis IV of Bavaria. He continued the Ghibelline war policy, with Parma and Reggio also under his power. Pope John XXII declared Bonacolsi a rebel against the Church and granted indulgences as befit a Crusader to any who could harm his person or his possessions.

In the months before the battle, border clashes intensified. In July, the Bolognese entered the Modenese territory and laid waste the fields in the section "between the canals" by fire and sword. In August, a Bolognese rabble, headed by their podestà, spent two weeks ravaging other lands of Modena. In September, Mantua took its turn, and at the end of that month, the strategic Bolognese rocca of Monteveglio was betrayed to Modena by malcontents. Two renegade castellans were decapitated.

== Battle of Zappolino ==
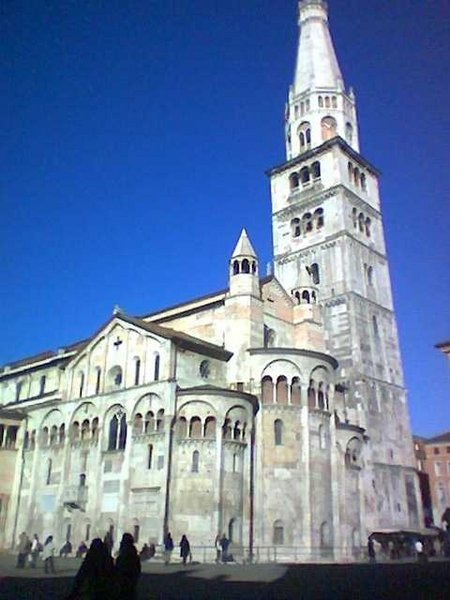
Torre della Ghirlandina, where the bucket was kept.

After Bologna mustered an army of 32,000 men and marched against Modena in November, 7,000 Modenese under Bonacolsi met them at Zappolino, in Bolognese territory. The Bolognese were routed and fled into the walls of their city. About 2,000 men were killed on both sides. Some accounts state that the Modenese took a bucket from a well just outside a city gate as a trophy.

== Aftermath ==
After the war, Ghibelline power had risen once again, but the wars were not over. In 1447, the Ghibellines encountered failures when the Ambrosian Republic was created and broke down. The wars of the Guelphs and Ghibellines continued until 1529 when Charles I of Spain seized imperial power in Italy during the Italian Wars. Faced with the threat of a foreign invasion, both factions made peace with each other. The 17th-century Italian poet Alessandro Tassoni composed the mock-heroic epic La secchia rapita on the events of the War of the Bucket. Antonio Salieri wrote the opera La secchia rapita (1772) based on Tassoni's poem.
