= Lanfranco =

Italian architect

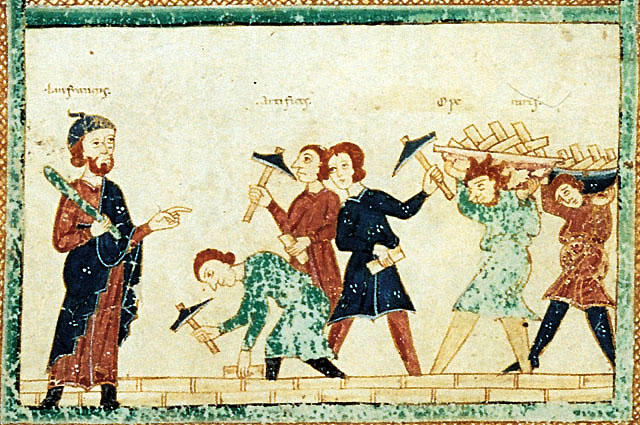
Lanfranco (left) directs the works

Lanfranco (active in Modena from c. 1099 to 1110) was an Italian architect. His only known work is the Modena Cathedral. Record of his work there is in the early 13th-century manuscript Relatio de innovatione ecclesie sancti Gemeniani in the Chapter archives of Modena. Here he is described as the "principal and supreme artificer of such an arduous undertaking". Together with Bonsignore, the Bishop of Reggio, Lanfranco discovered the urn with relics of St. Geminianus for the new church in 1106. A Latin apsidal epigraph in the cathedral describes Lanfranco as "famous for ingenuity, knowledgeable and competent director of works, governor and master".
