= Porta San Felice, Bologna =

Coordinates: 44°29′57″N 11°19′38″E

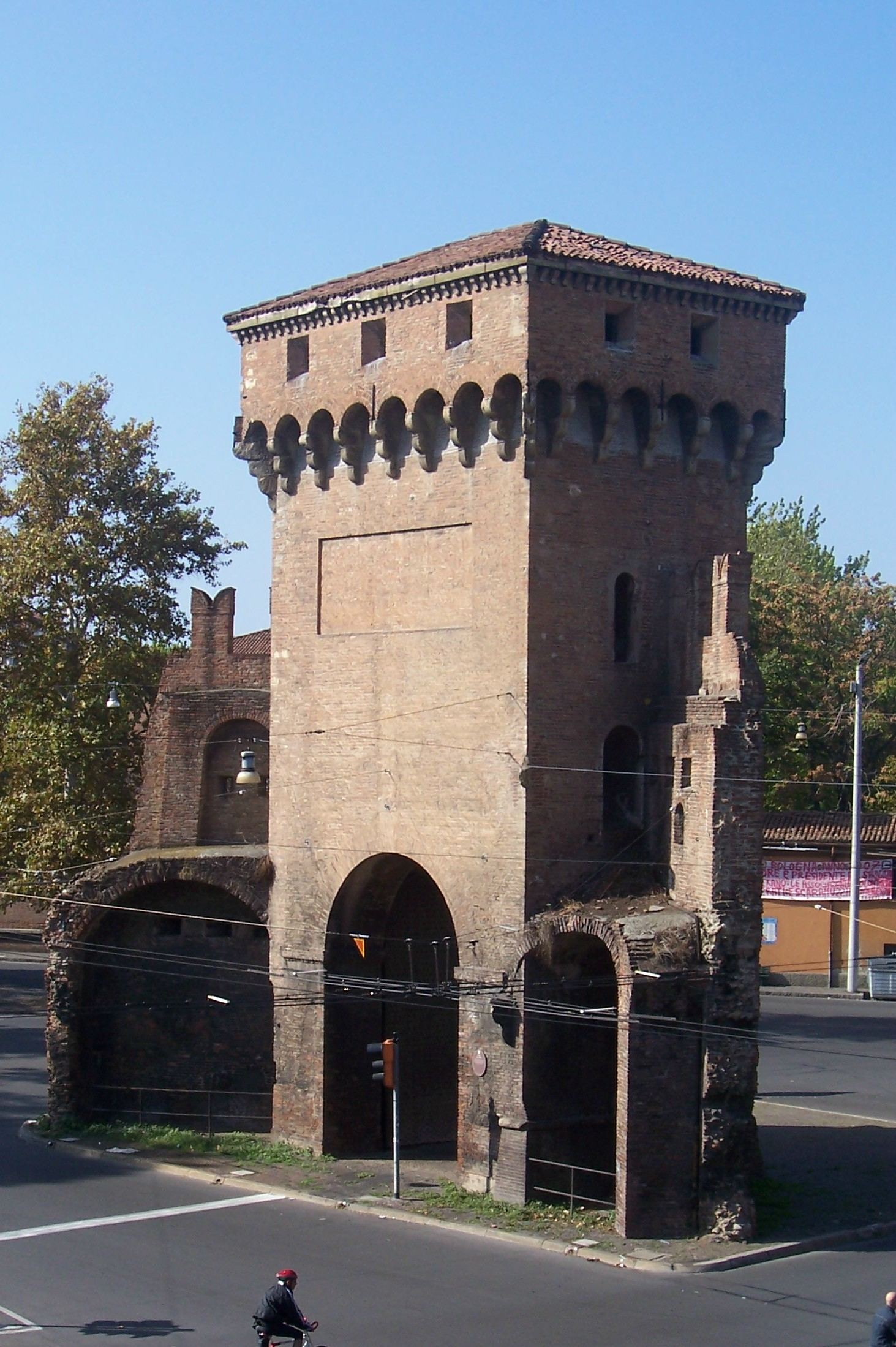
Porta San Felice

Porta San Felice was the westernmost gate or portal of the former outer medieval walls of the city of Bologna, Italy. It led into Via Emilia, here Via San Felice changes name to Via Aurelio Saffi, After crossing the Viali di Circonvallazione of Bologna.

The gate was erected in the 13th century, and rebuilt in 1334 with a machiocolated tower and drawbridge. It was restored in 1508, and again in 1805 when Napoleon visited the city. In 1840, the flanking walls were torn down. A barracks and tax house for collecting duties was in the past found astride the entrance.
