= Alessandro Tassoni =

16th/17th-century Italian poet and writer

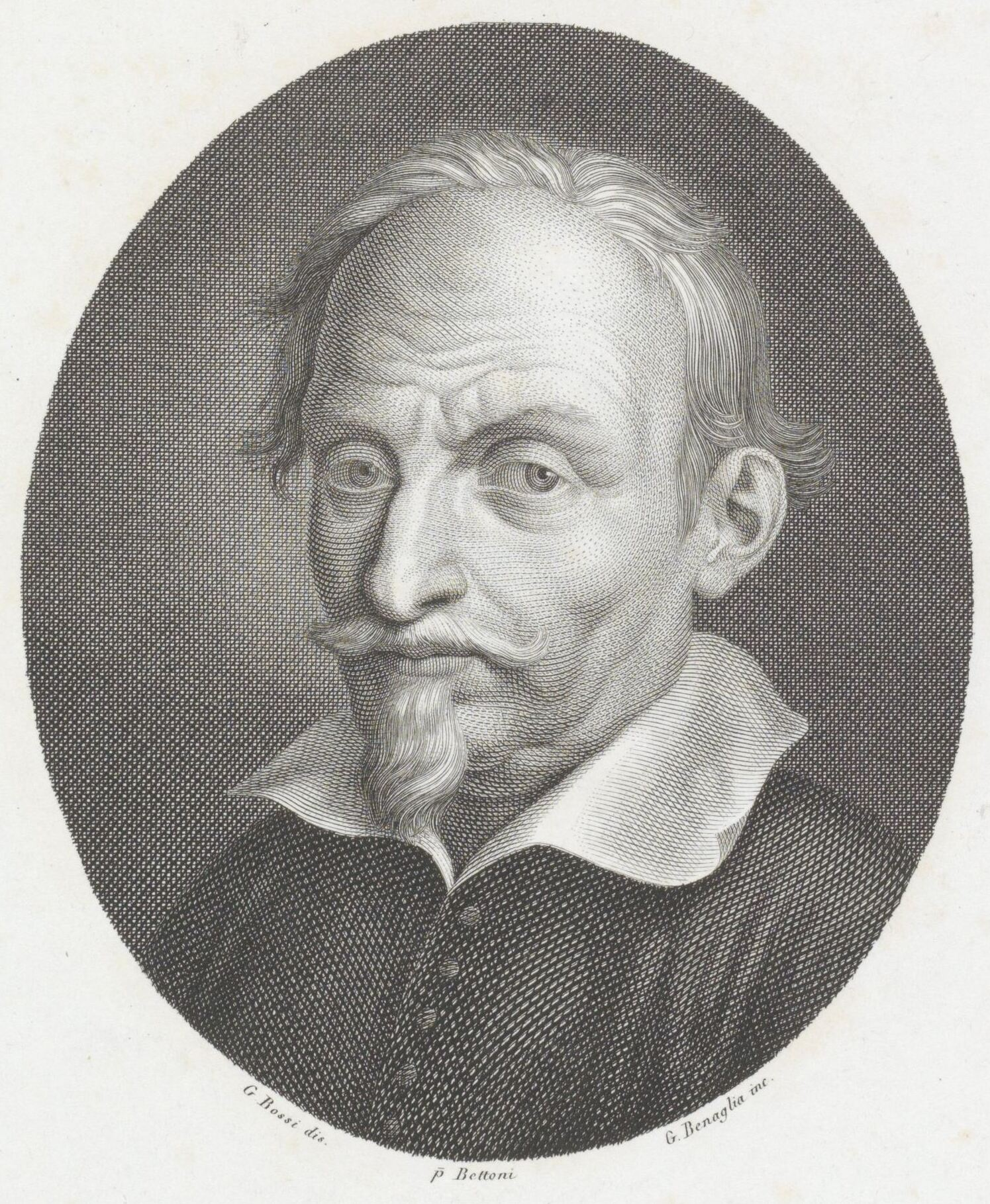
- Born: 28 September 1565; Modena, Duchy of Modena and Reggio
- Died: 25 April 1635; Modena, Duchy of Modena and Reggio
- Education: University of Bologna, University of Pisa, University of Ferrara
- Occupations: Writer, poet, literary critic
- Notable work: La secchia rapita
- Movement: Baroque

Alessandro Tassoni (28 September 1565 – 25 April 1635) was an Italian poet and writer, from Modena, best known as the author of the mock-heroic poem La secchia rapita (The Rape of the Bucket, literally The stolen bucket).

== Life ==
He was born in Modena, to a noble family, from Bernardino Tassoni and Sigismonda Pellicciari. Having lost both parents at an early age, he was raised by the maternal grandfather, Giovanni Pellicciari. It was with Giovanni that, according to tradition, he first visited the bucket, which was later to inspire his major work, in the belfry of Modena's Cathedral.

At the age of 13, Alessandro Tassoni was taught Greek and Latin by Lazzaro Labadini, a professor of literature at the university.

He then became a law student, attending university in Modena, then in Bologna, Pisa and Ferrara, where he eventually graduated. He appears to have been a rowdy youth, living for some time in Nonantola, from where he was expelled in 1595, due to several incidents in which Tassoni had been involved as a member of a local street gang.

In 1597, he began his service for the cardinal Ascanio Colonna whom he followed to Spain. In 1589 he was elected to the Accademia della Crusca. In 1603, he was back in Italy and moved to Rome.

In 1612 he published anonymously the booklet Le Filippiche in which he attacked the Spanish domination of parts of the Italian peninsula. Though he always denied having written it (probably for fear of Spanish retaliation), the work became famous enough to ingratiate Tassoni to the Charles Emmanuel I, Duke of Savoy, who, in 1618 hired him in Turin with the title of first secretary.

After this, Tassoni was with the cardinal Ludovico Ludovisi in 1626 and served under Francesco I d'Este, duke of Modena, in 1635.

He died in Modena. His fellow citizens remembered his life and work with a statue that can still be seen in front of the town symbol, the Ghirlandina.

== Work ==
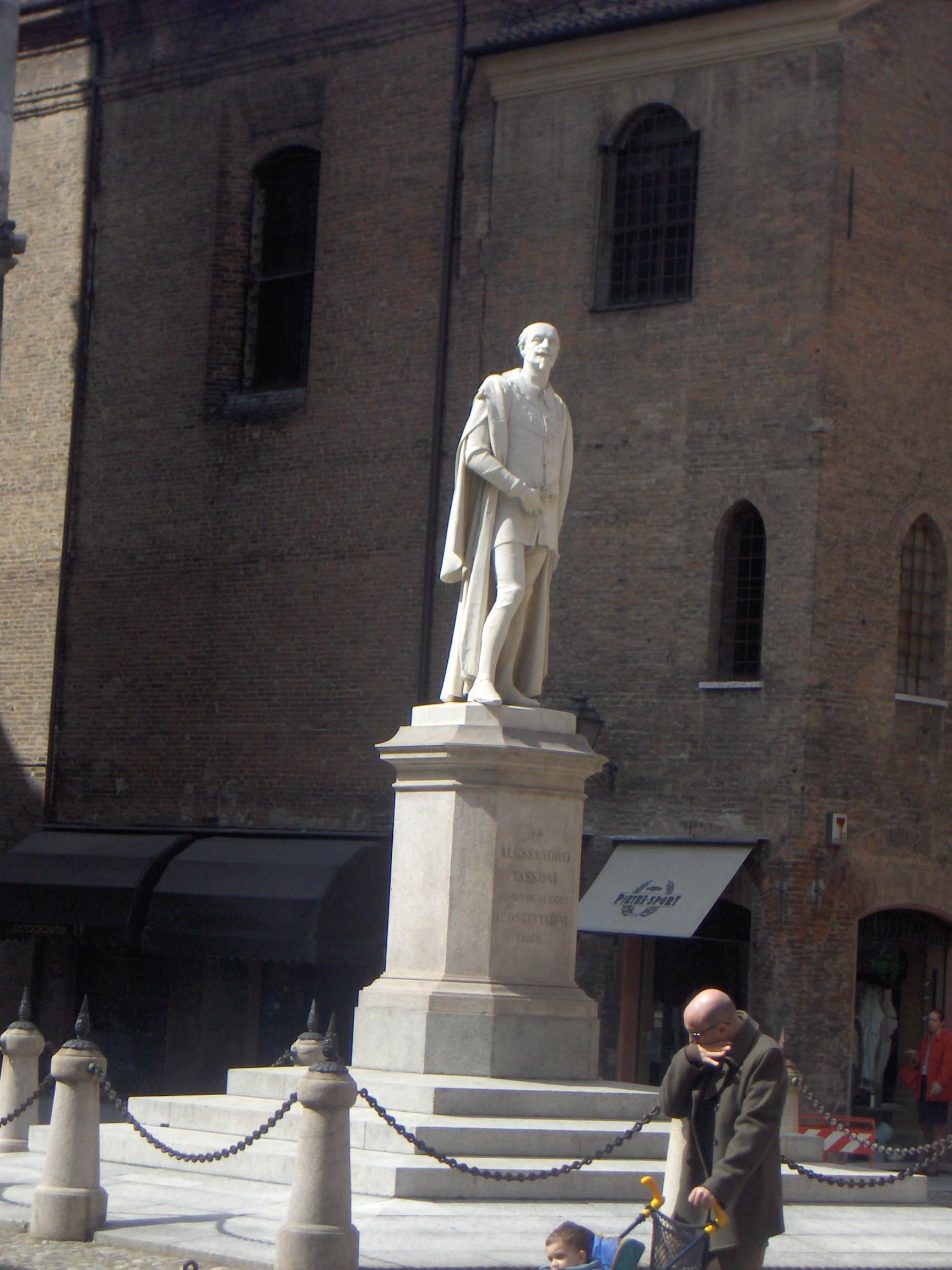
Alessandro Tassoni monument, below the Ghirlandina

Besides the above-mentioned "Filippiche", Tassoni is known for other works, some of poetry and some of literary criticism. The latter includes the Varietà di pensieri di Alessandro Tassoni ("Diverse meditations by Alessandro Tassoni"), and Considerazioni sopra il Petrarcha (1609), a piece of criticism showing independence of traditional views. However, Tassoni is best known as the author of the mock-heroic poem La secchia rapita (The Rape of the Bucket, or The stolen bucket); it is by virtue of this work that he is remembered as Modena's poet laureate.

=== La secchia rapita ===
La secchia rapita was written by Tassoni between 1614 and 1615 and first published in Paris in 1622. It was not to be published in Italy until Tassoni modified it slightly to accommodate the censorship of the Catholic Church. Tassoni paid for the first Italian edition, bearing his own name, in 1624 (the poem had been previously circulated under the pseudonym of Aldrovinci Melisone). The final edition was published in 1630.

The poem is loosely based on a war originating from the battle of Zappolino fought between Modena and Bologna in 1325. Most of the events reported in the poem are completely fictitious, even incorporating in the war the battle of Fossalta which had been fought almost a hundred years before. The central episode, in which the Modenese steal a bucket from their rivals, is not reported by the main contemporary historians, however a bucket, purported to be that very trophy, has been on display, in the basement of the Torre della Ghirlandina, from the times of the battle to present.

In the poem, the theft of the bucket results in the eruption of an extremely complicated war, where even the Olympian gods take part (this is in the tradition of classical poems such as Homer's Iliad) and is eventually resolved by the intervention of the Pope.

The narration is dotted by references to situations and persons contemporary to the author, and with farcical appearances such as the "Conte di Culagna" (Count of Ass-land) probably the best known character of the book. In the third chapter of the poem, armies from all over the country arrive to take part in the war, and the Conte of Culagna makes his first appearance:

[...]
Quest'era un cavalier bravo e galante,
filosofo poeta e bacchettone
ch'era fuor de' perigli un Sacripante,
ma ne' perigli un pezzo di polmone.
Spesso ammazzato avea qualche gigante,
e si scopriva poi ch'era un cappone,
onde i fanciulli dietro di lontano
gli soleano gridar: - Viva Martano. -

Avea ducento scrocchi in una schiera,
mangiati da la fame e pidocchiosi;
ma egli dicea ch'eran duo mila e ch'era
una falange d'uomini famosi:
dipinto avea un pavon ne la bandiera
con ricami di seta e d'or pomposi:
l'armatura d'argento e molto adorna;
e in testa un gran cimier di piume e corna.
[...]

Translation:

[...]
He was a brave and gallant knight
A philosopher a poet and a moralist,
A devil out of the fight,
A meek guy when close to peril.
He often claimed he had killed a giant,
which was then discovered to be a chicken,
and for this the kids, seeing him approaching,
would follow him shouting "Long live Martano!"

He had two hundred armed men,
hungry and lousy;
but he claimed it was an army of two thousand
famous knights;
his coat of arms was a peacock,
his armour silver;
on the head he wore an helmet decorated
with feathers and horns(*)
[...]

(*)The feathers recall the peacock and its vanity, the horns are the traditional symbol of the cuckold.

La secchia rapita was immensely popular both in Italy and abroad.

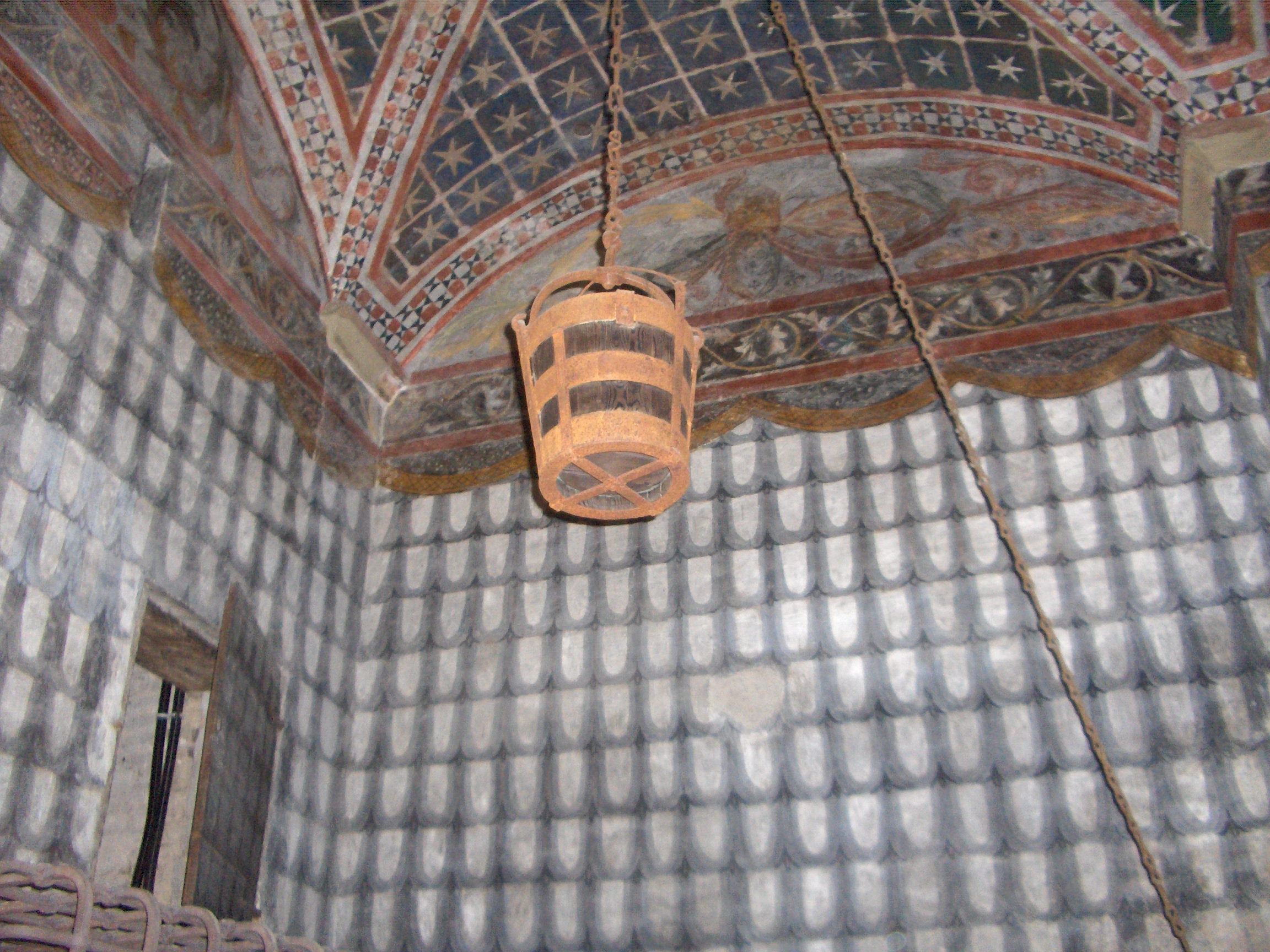
The Stolen Bucket, inside the Ghirlandina Tower
