= Torre della Ghirlandina =

Torre Civica
UNESCO World Heritage Site
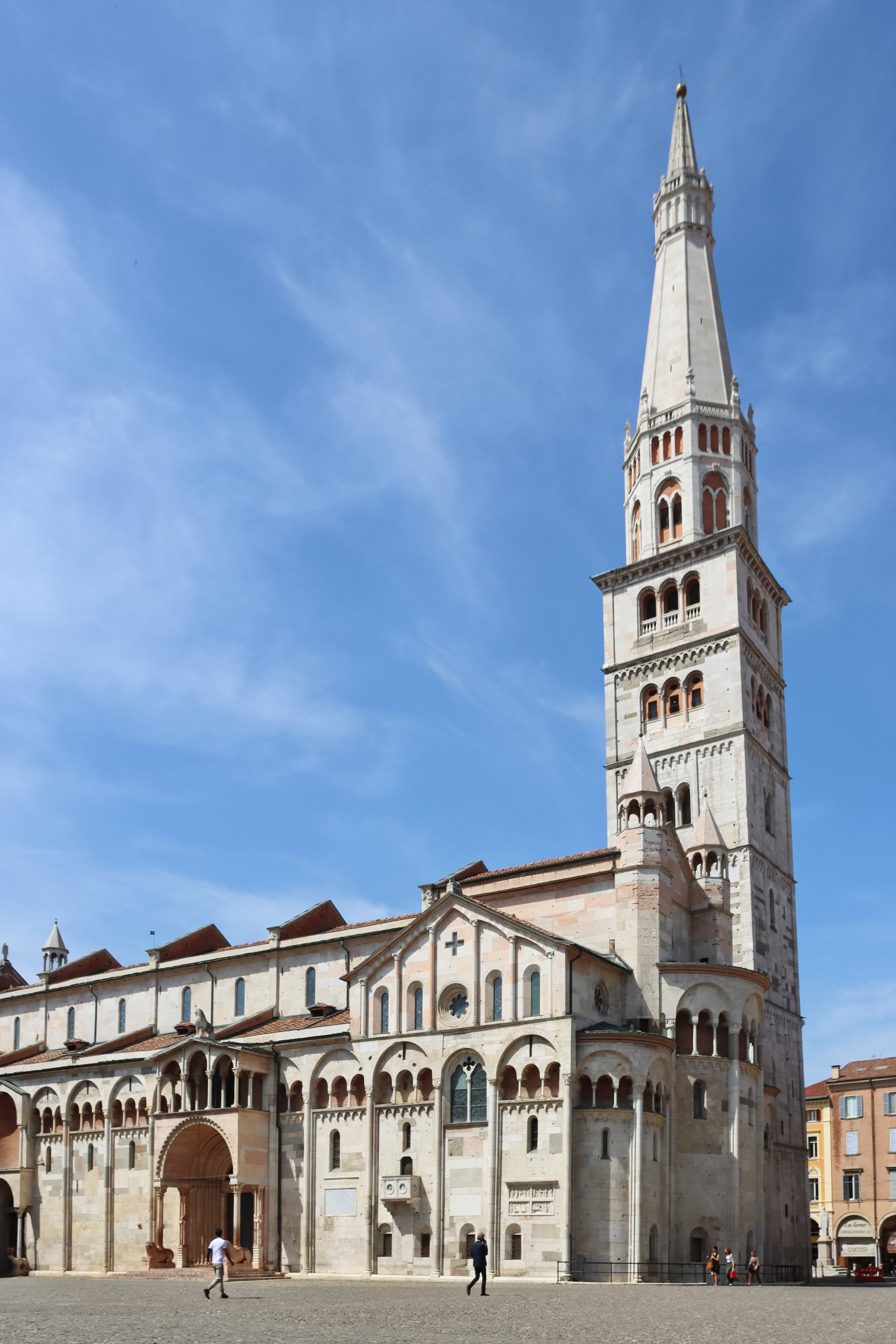
- Modena Cathedral with the Ghirlandina from southwest
- Interactive map of Torre Civica
- Location: Modena, Province of Modena, Emilia-Romagna, Italy
- Part of: Cathedral, Torre Civica and Piazza Grande, Modena
- Criteria: Cultural: (i)(ii)(iii)(iv)
- Reference: 827
- Inscription: 1997 (21st Session)
- Coordinates: 44°38′47″N 10°55′34″E

The Torre della Ghirlandina or simply Ghirlandina (Emilian: Ghirlandèina) is the Campanile of the Cathedral of Modena, in Emilia-Romagna, Italy. At 86.12 meters tall, the bell tower is the symbol of Modena and a prominent landmark visible from afar. The cathedral, the bell tower, and the Piazza Grande were declared a UNESCO World Heritage Site in 1997.

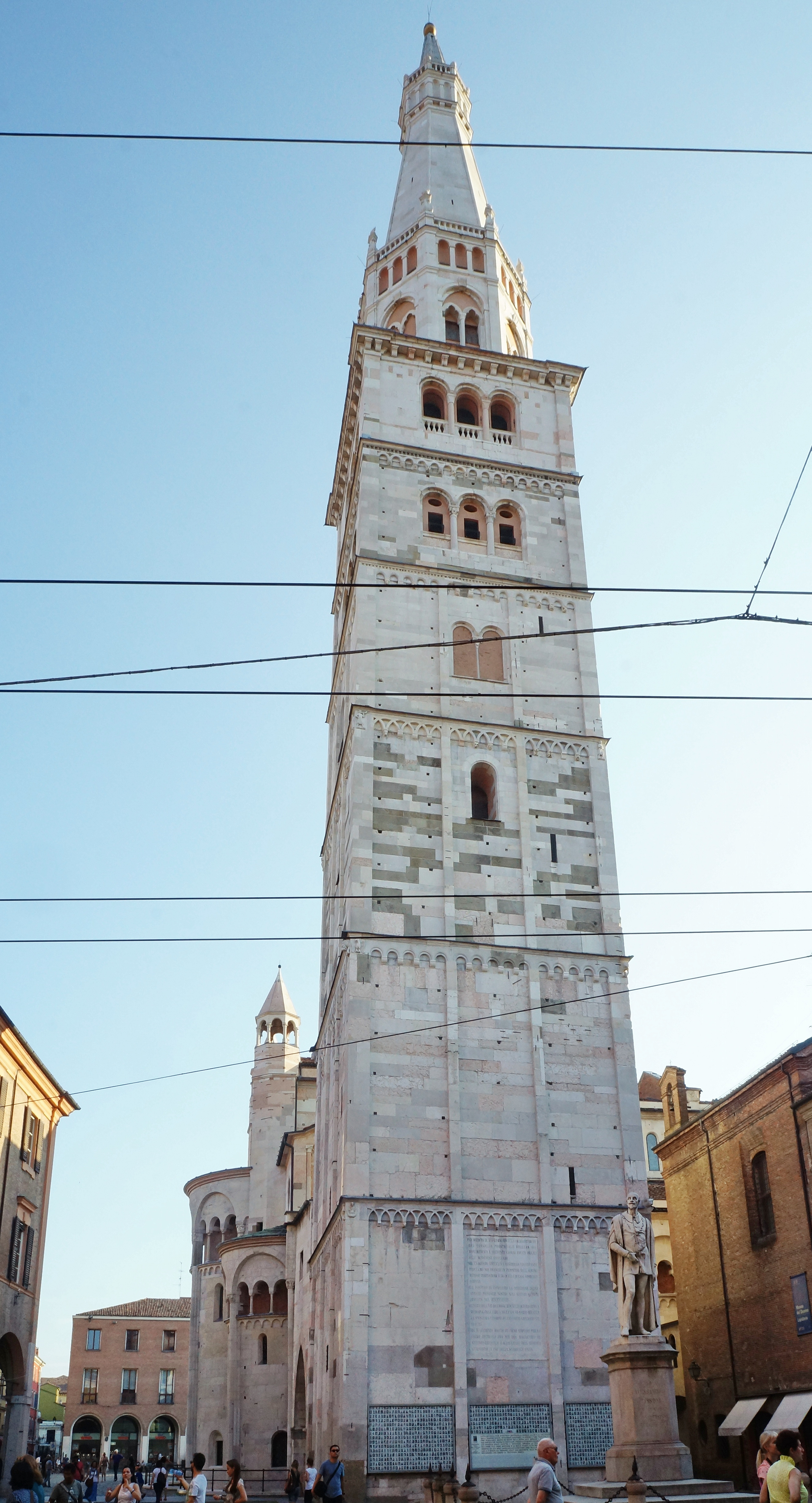
La Ghirlandina, north side

== History ==
The tower originally called the Torre di San Geminiano was built around 1130, along with the cathedral, according to a design by Lanfranco. It had four stories on a square base. Since it was incomplete and lacked a bell tower, builders from Campione were commissioned to complete it in 1167. By 1179, they had added a fifth story, and from 1261 onwards, a sixth (also on a square base). In the following century, partly due to rivalry with Bologna, the characteristic octagonal spire was added. This was based on a design by Arrigo da Campione, who adapted the style of the cathedral and tower to the new northern Gothic style. The tower was finally crowned with a golden sphere on its summit in 1319. A marble balustrade runs around the base of the octagonal tented roof, crowned at the corners by pinnacle-like finials. Each is decorated on two sides with cascading garlands, which gave the tower its present name.

== Interior ==
The stories, which gradually decrease in height on the exterior and are distinguished by cornices, do not correspond to the internal structure of the campanile. The Sala della Secchia rapita, located approximately at the level of the first outer stringcourse, was used from the 14th century onwards as a kind of treasury and archive for the municipality, where documents of the community as well as, for example, relics of saints from the cathedral were safely kept. It was decorated like a casket with graphic and plant ornaments, as well as heraldic fur. The name, "Hall of the Stolen Bucket," refers to a bucket from the fountain on Via San Felice in the center of Bologna, which was stolen during the Battle of Zappolino in 1325 (also called "War of the Bucket"). It was preserved as a war trophy and immortalized in verse by Modena's most famous poet, Alessandro Tassoni (1622). Above the hall, the tower is a largely open space with a staircase running along the walls all around. On (approximately) the 5th floor is the Stanza dei Torresani, whose Romanesque capitals are noteworthy.

== Forecourt ==
On the north side of the tower, facing the small Piazza Torre, which opens onto Via Aemilia, three memorial plaques show photographs of Modena partisans who fell fighting against Italian fascism. On the wall above is a 19th-century inscription. In front of it stands a monument to Alessandro Tassoni, Modena's most famous poet. The statue, created by the sculptor Alessandro Cavazza, was erected in 1860.

== Gallery ==
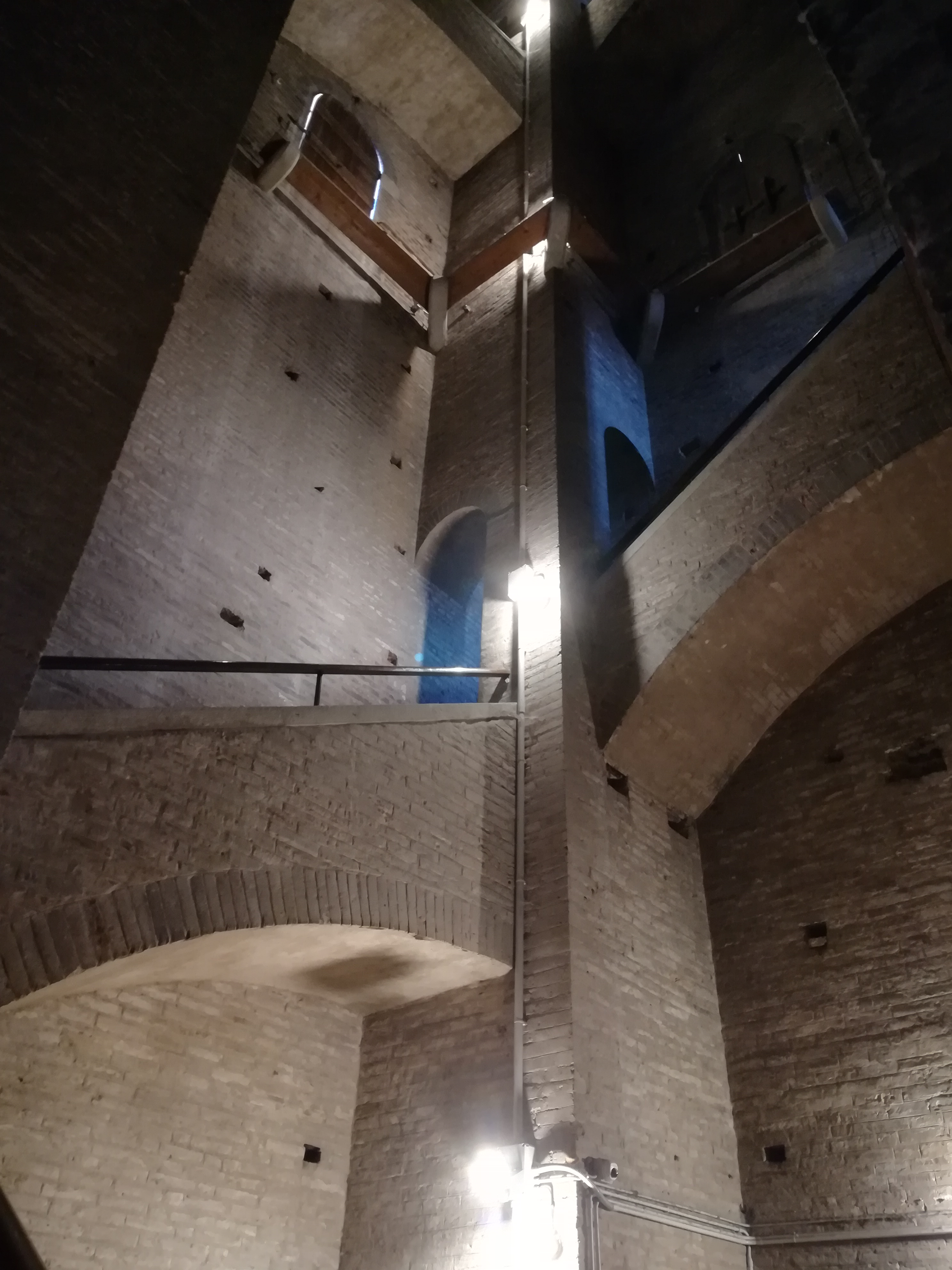
Inside the tower

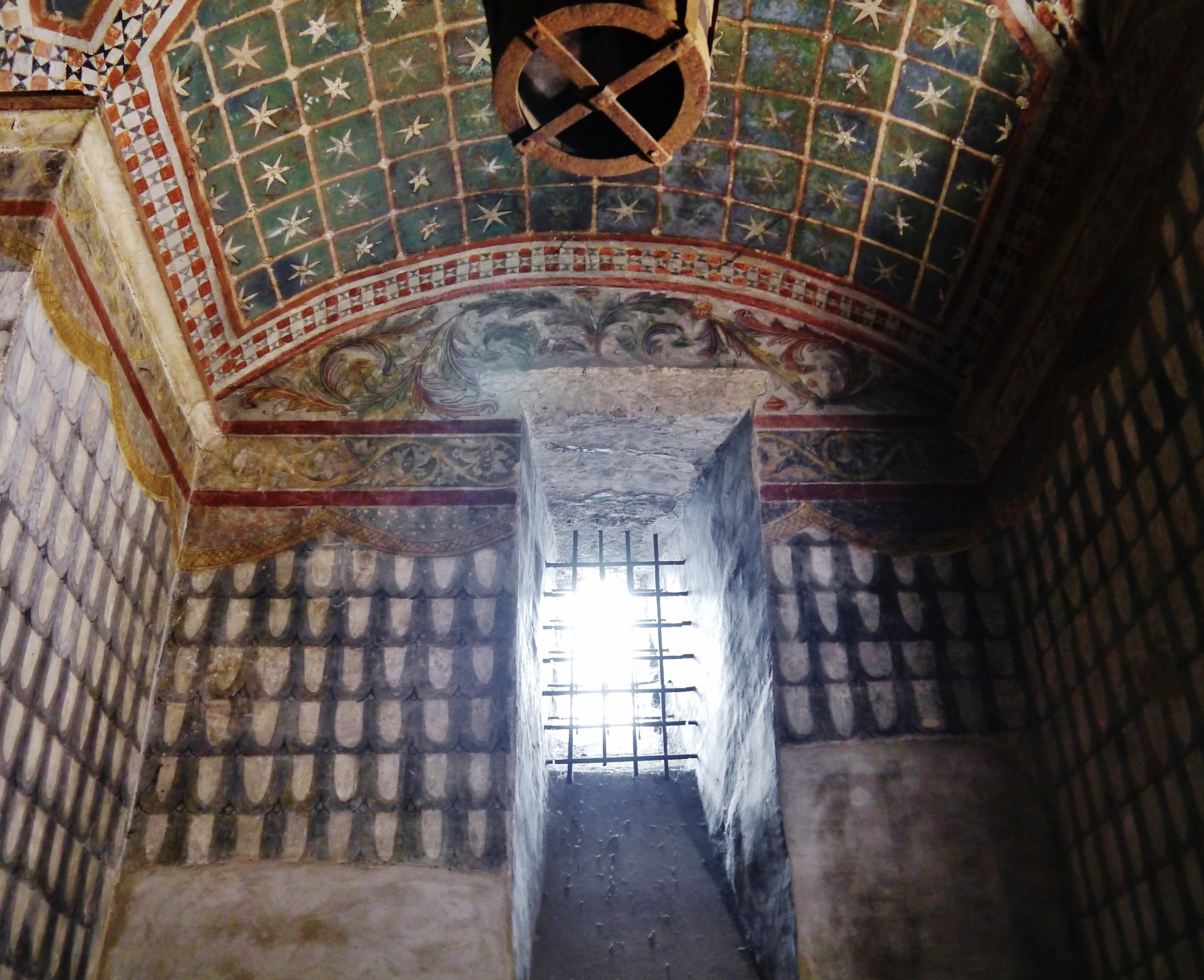
The Sala della Secchia rapita with frescoes from the 15th century

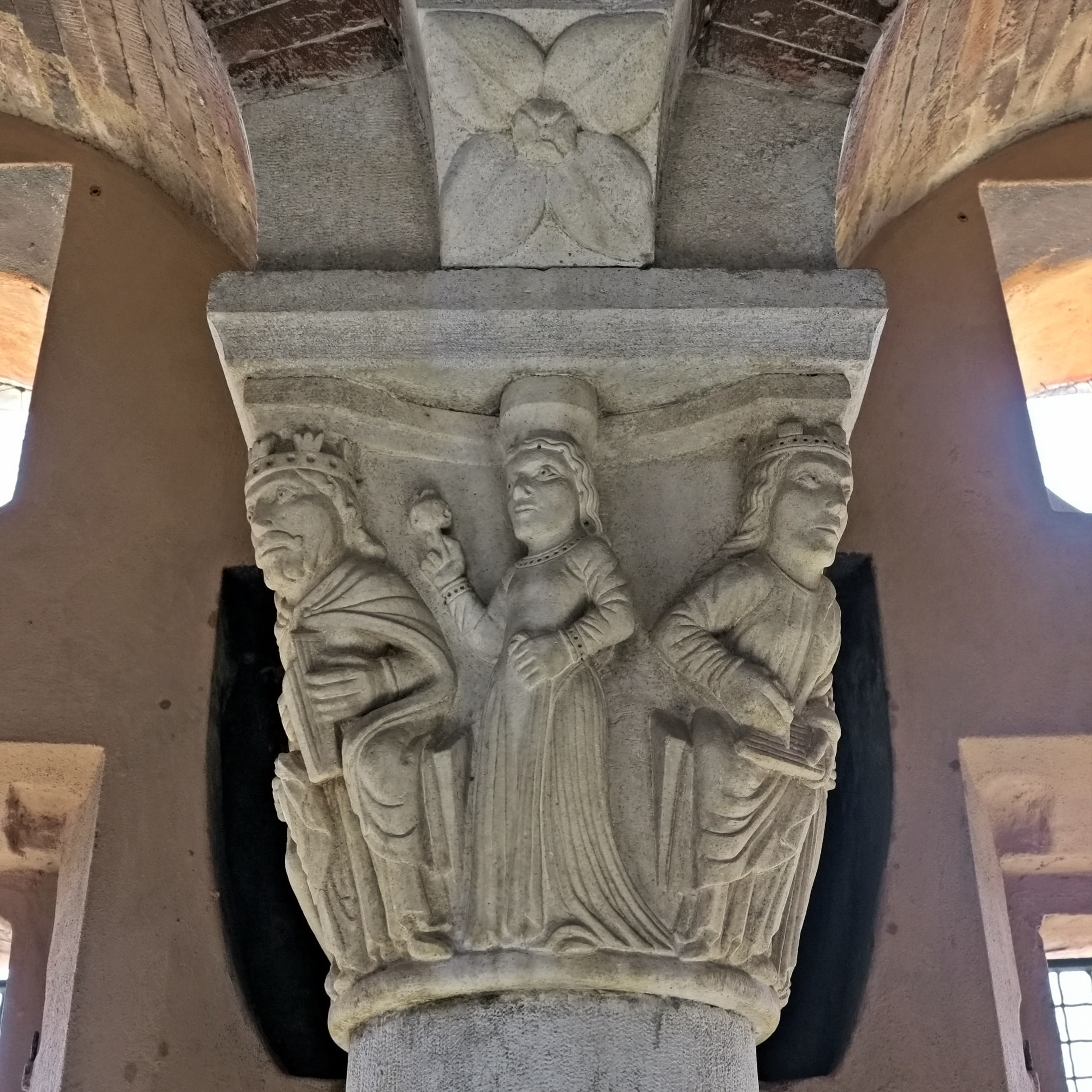
Capital of the Stanza dei Torresani with David

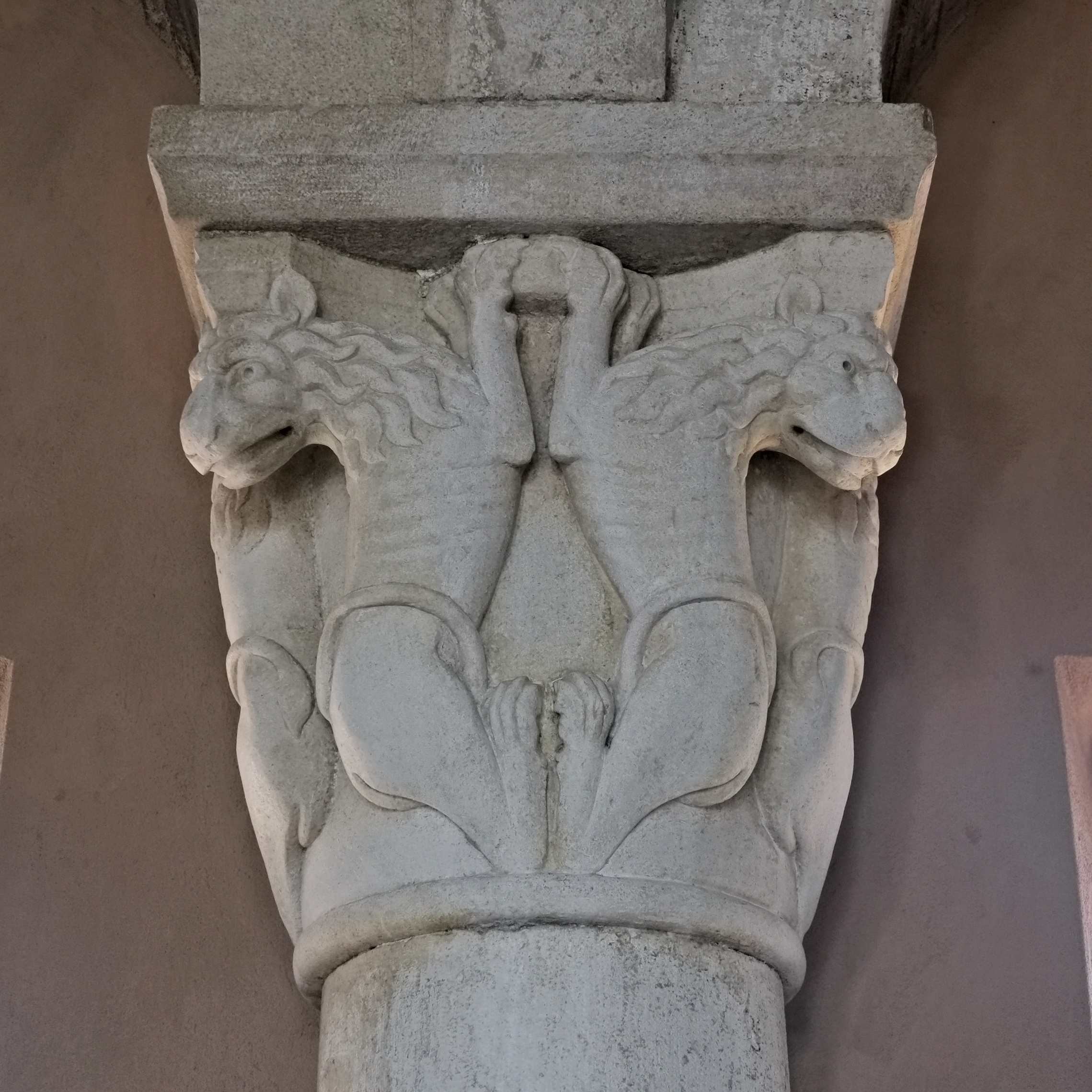
Capital of the Stanza dei Torresani with lions

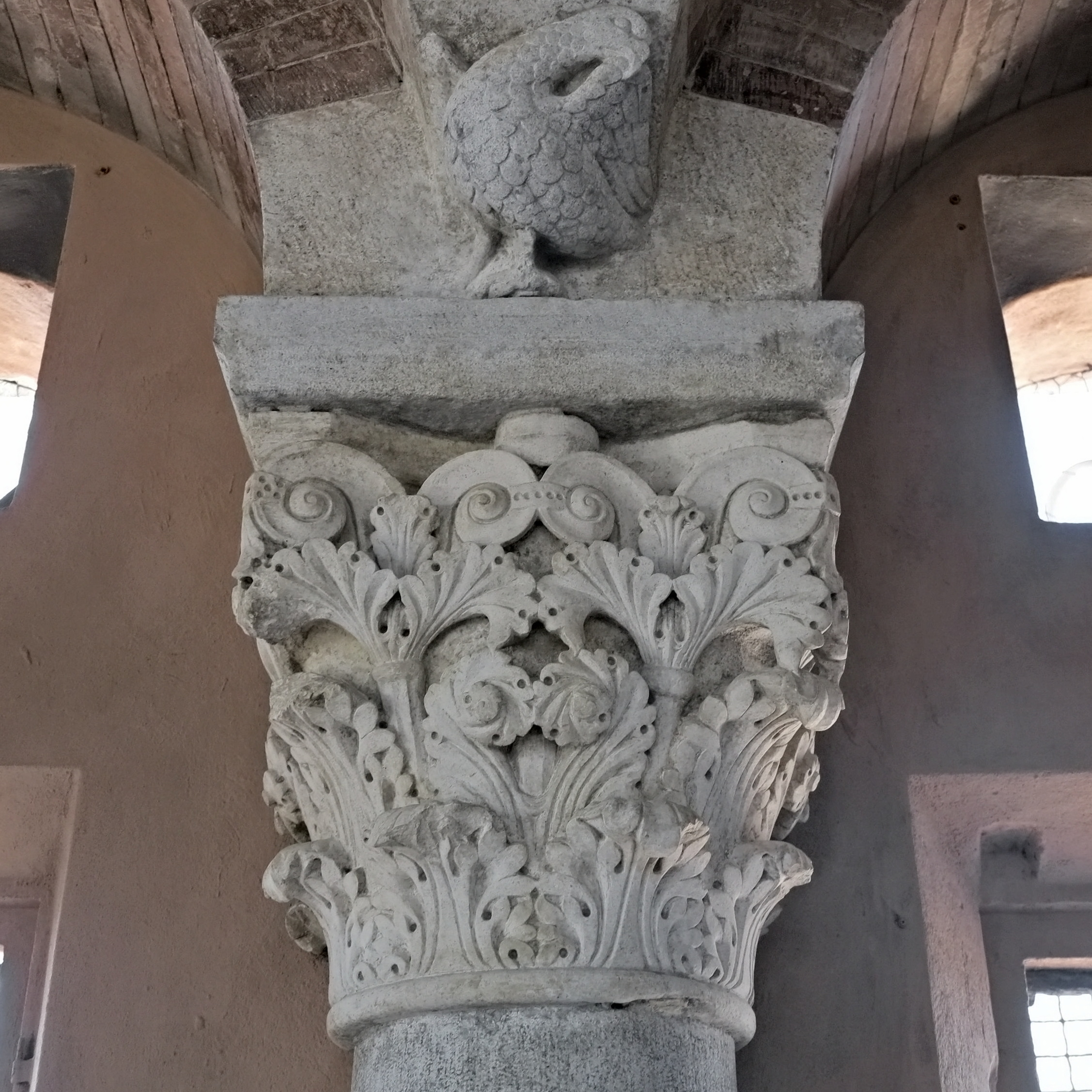
Corinthian capital and impost with eagle, Stanza dei Torresani

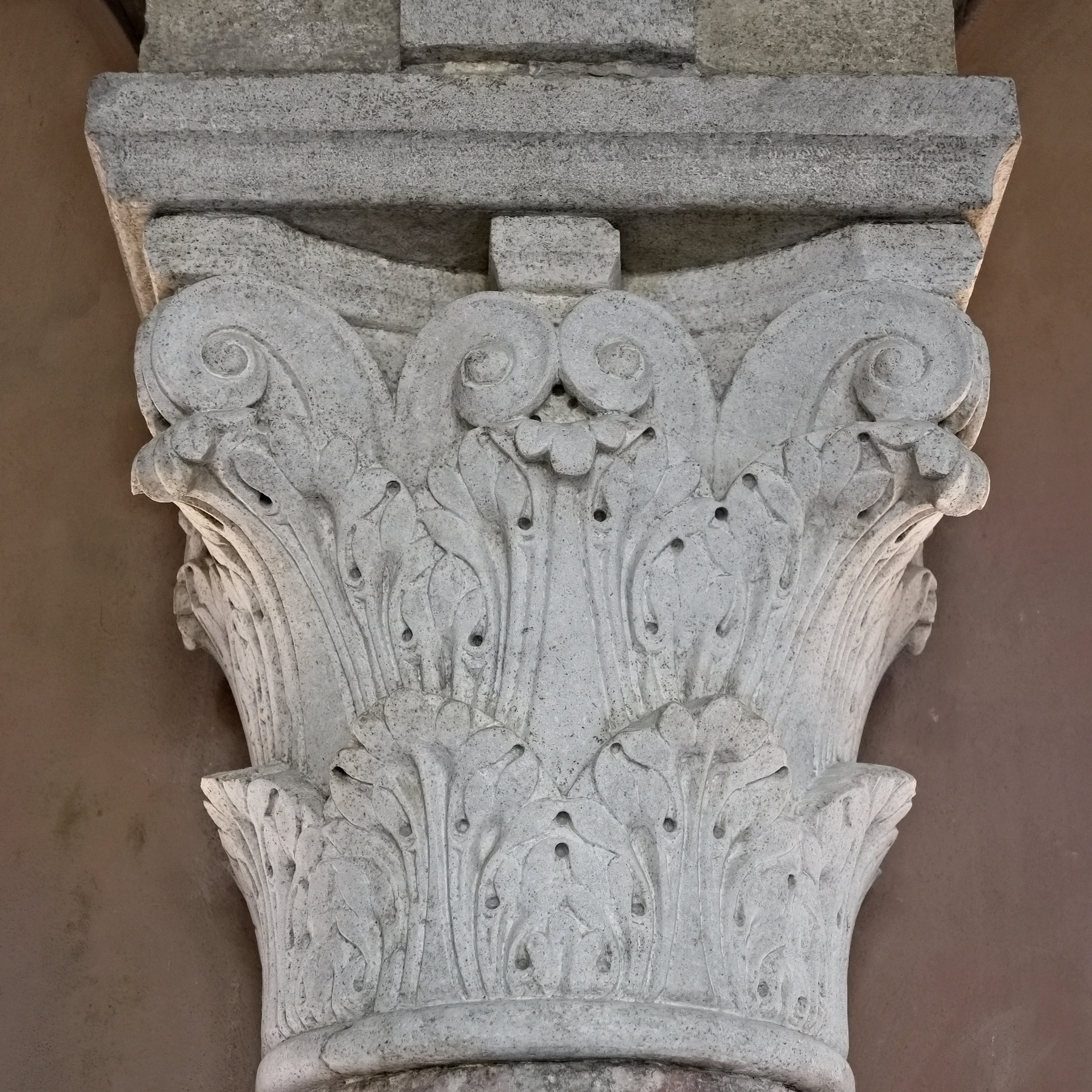
Corinthian capital of the Stanza dei Torresani

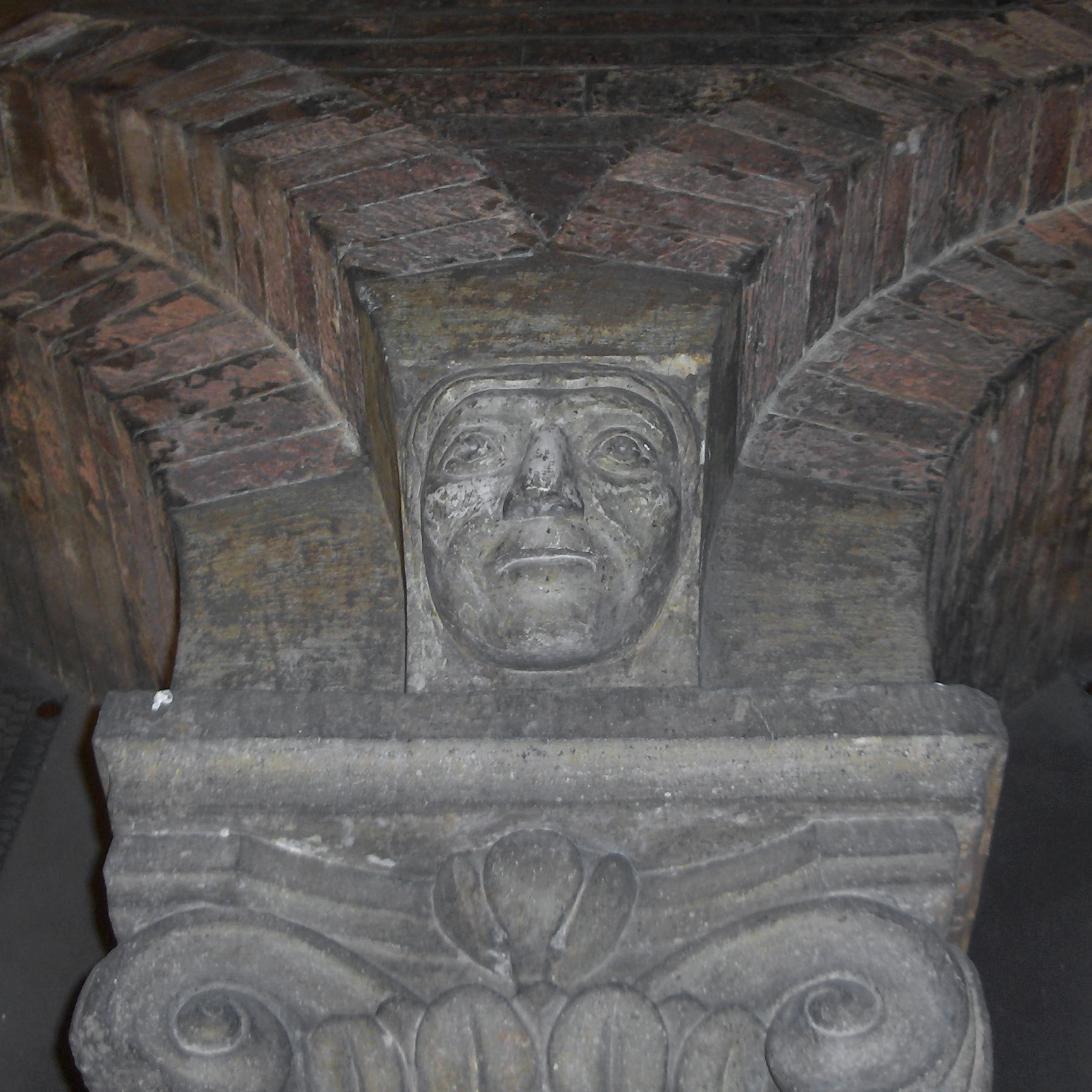
Impost with face, Stanza dei Torresani

== Restoration ==
The tower underwent a restoration started in December 2007. At the beginning it was said it would be finished by the year 2010, but restoration work lasted till September 2011. During the work, the scaffolding was hidden behind an artistic screen painted by the Italian sculptor Mimmo Paladino. This choice has caused perplexity in the town, given the high cost of the operation and the very idea of it.

== Sources ==
- This article was originally a translation of this version of it:Ghirlandina from the Italian-language Wikipedia and the Emilian e Rumagnòl-language Wikipedia eml:Ghirlandèina.
- Rosella Cadignani (ed.). The Ghirlandina Tower: Conservation Project. Fondazione di Modena, Luca Sossella Editore, Rome 2009 (Italian/English).
- Rosella Cadignani (ed.), Stefano Lugni. The Ghirlandina Tower: History and Restoration. Fondazione di Modena, Luca Sossella Editore, Rome 2010 (Italian/English).
