= List of compositions by Antonio Salieri =

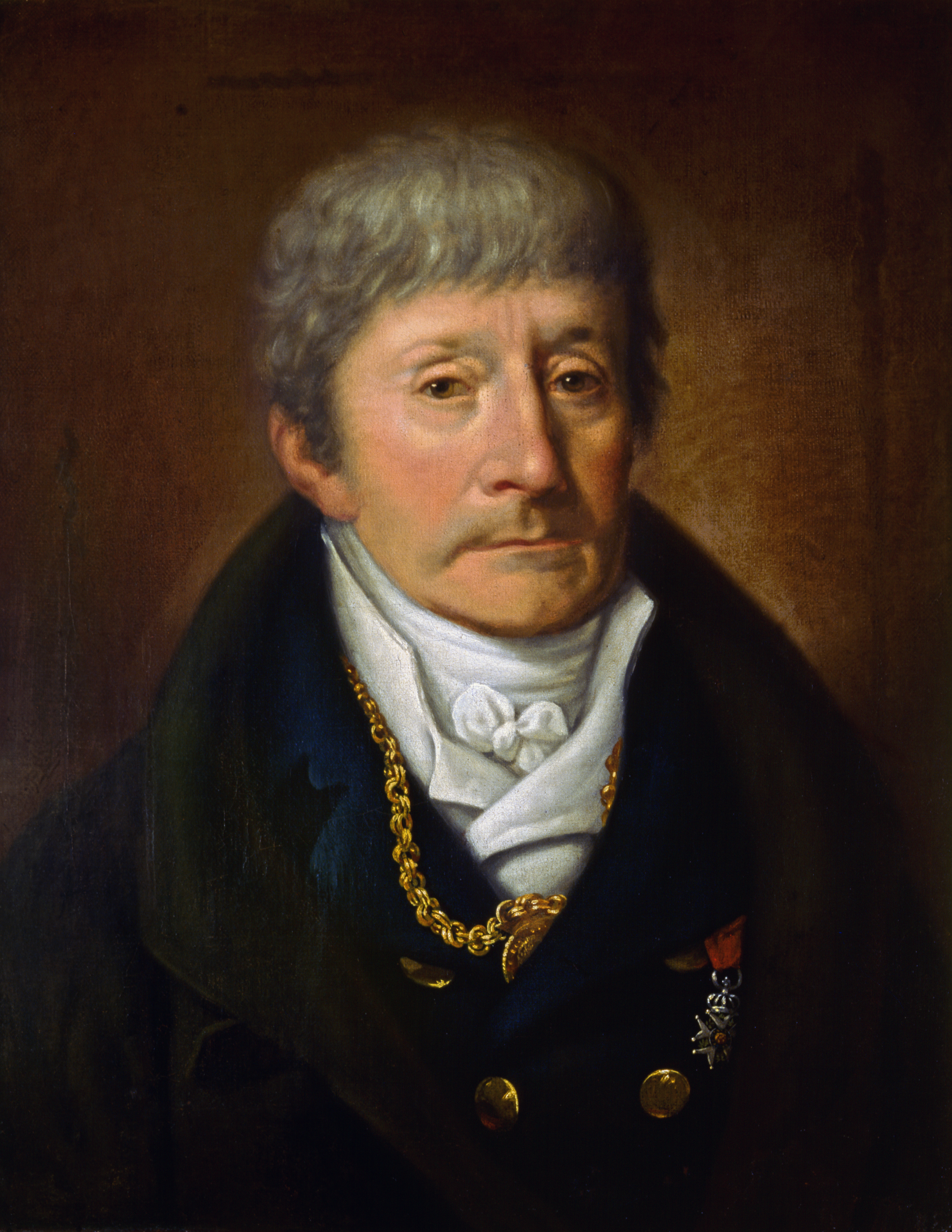
Portrait of Salieri by Joseph Willibrord Mähler

This is a list of musical compositions by Antonio Salieri (August 18, 1750 – May 7, 1825), organized by genre. Together, the opus consists of approximately 652 works.

== Secular vocal music ==
=== Operas ===
- L'amore innocente
- Don Chisciotte alle nozze di Gamace
- Armida
- La fiera di Venezia
- Europa riconosciuta
- La scuola de' gelosi
- Les Danaïdes
- Il ricco d'un giorno
- La grotta di Trofonio
- Prima la musica e poi le parole
- Les Horaces
- Tarare
- Axur, re d'Ormus
- La cifra
- Palmira, regina di Persia
- Falstaff, ossia Le tre burle

==== Insertion arias and ensembles ====
- "Addio carina bella" (Meng.) aria in G major for bass and orchestra, for?
- "Affé questa sera grandissima" - "Una domina? Una nipote?" (Don Anchise) arie & recitative for bass and orchestra (1775?), for P. Anfossi's "La finta giardiniera"?
- "Ah ciel che noja è questa" - fragment -
- "Ah dove amici" recitative for soprano and orchestra, for?
- "Ah non siete ogni si facile" (Tenast) aria for tenor and orchestra, for?
- "Alla speranza" (Galatea) aria for soprano and Orchestra, for?
- "All'idea del gran mistero" aria in A major for soprano, choir and orchestra, for?
- "Anch'io nello specchio talora" aria in E major for soprano and orchestra (1771), for?
- "Cedo l'intatto pegno" (Dely - Davidde) duet for soprano, tenor and orchestra, for?
- "Che mi s'appresti?" (Capitano) aria in C major for bass and orchestra (1775), for?
- "[...] che strane vicende" (Ros. - Fior. - Pasq. - Fulg.) fragmentary finale of an opera (Atto II), for A. Felici's "La novità"?
- "Chi vuol la zingara" Duett für zwei Soprane und Orchester, für?
- "Dall'uso parigino il bello, il sopraffino" aria in C major for soprano and orchestra (1773), for?
- "Del morir le angoscie adesso" scene and aria for tenor and orchestra
- "Denke nicht der Zeit der Schmerzen" duet for soprano, tenor and orchestra, for?
- "Dico sol, che la padrona" (Lena) aria for soprano and orchestra, for "La Locandiera"?
- "D'oro saranno i letti" (Fulg.) aria in D major for bass and orchestra (1775), for?
- "Dottorini saputelli" (Clar.) arie for soprano and orchestra (1774), for?
- "Eccomi al punto ch'io già tanta temei" fragmentary aria for soprano and orchestra, for?
- "Fate largo al gran Pasquino" (Pasquino) aria in D major for bass and orchestra (1775), for A. Felici's "La novità"?
- "Figlia mia diletta" trio for soprano, tenor, bass and orchestra, for?
- "Fra tanto pietre brune" (Polidoro) recitative for bass and orchestra (1785?), für D. Cimarosa's "L'Italiana in Londra"?
- "Goder lasciatemi" (Gianetta) aria for soprano and orchestra, for?
- "Gran diavolo!" (Uberto) aria in F major for bass and orchestra, for?
- "Guarda in quel volto" aria in E♭ major for soprano and orchestra, for?
- "Ho perduto la mia pace" (Brettone) aria for tenor and orchestra (1775), for G. Paisiello's "L'innocenza fortunata"?
- "Ho stampato libri in foglio" aria for tenor and orchestra, for?
- "Il pargoletto amabile" aria in A major for tenor and orchestra, for?
- "In tuo favore mi parla il core" duet for two sopranos and orchestra, for?
- "Io contento", recitative, for?
- "Io di nuovo vel ripeto" aria for soprano and orchestra (1777), for?
- "Io lo dico e il posso dire" trio for alto, tenor, bass and orchestra, for?
- "Io non so che pensare" recitative and cavatina for tenor and orchestra, for?
- "La donna è sempre instabile" (Belfusio) aria for tenor and orchestra, for "La fiera di Venezia"?
- "La mia morosa me l'ha fatta" (Sandrina) aria for soprano and orchestra, for "Il talismano"?
- "L'amour est un dieu" Canzone for soprano and orchestra, for?
- "La sposa se cedo" aria for soprano and orchestra, for?
- "Le diras, che il campione" (Gusman) aria for bass and orchestra (1775), for?
- "Le Inconvenienze teatrali" quartet for soprano, alto, tenor, bass and orchestra, for?
- "L'introduco immantinente" - "Quando ho visto il dottorino" (Rosina) recitative and aria for soprano and orchestra (1776), for "La finta scema"
- "Madame vezzosissima" (Zeffirina - Valerio) fragmentary recitative and duet, for?
- "Ma quai mali intorno al core" aria for tenor and orchestra
- "Ma quale agli occhi miei" (Conte) recitative, for?
- "Mia vaga Dorilla" aria for Bass and orchestra (1775), for B. Galuppi's "Il marchese villano"
- "Moriam, moriam mia vita" recitative and duet for soprano, tenor and orchestra, for?
- "Nel mio seno" aria, for?
- "Non per parlar d'amore" (Laurina) aria in E♭ major for soprano and orchestra, for N. Piccinni's "L'astretta"
- "Non temer che d'altri" (Falsirena) aria for soprano and orchestra (1779), for "La fiera di Venezia"
- "Non veste alla moda" (Aga.) aria for bass and orchestra (1774), for?
- "Non vi fidate" aria for soprano and orchestra, for?
- "Oh che donna che matta" (Peppino), recitative, for?
- "Oh me infelice - Allor potrei" recitative and aria, for?
- "Oh qual sorpasso giubilo" (Pilemone) aria in F major für bass and orchestra, for "Eraclito e Democrito"?
- "Oh quanti veggarsi" (Cardano) aria for tenor and orchestra, for "Il talismano"?
- "Oh sancte inviete" aria for soprano and orchestra (1775), for?
- "Padrona stimatissima" (Pasquino) aria in D major for bass and orchestra, for A. Felici's "La novità"?
- "Parlaste d'un cappone" aria for bass and orchestra (1776), for?
- "Pasquino avrà quest'ora" recitative, for A. Felici's "La novità"?
- "Paterio giudizio" aria for bass and orchestra, for?
- "Per amore io già vancillo" (Perillo) aria for tenor and orchestra (1770), for?
- "Perder sogetto amato" duet for two sopranos and orchestra, for?
- "Per voi s'avanzi" aria for bass and orchestra, for?
- "Qual densa notte" (Artalice - Chabri - Nehemia - Chor) finale of an opera, for?
- "Quando sarà mia sposa" (Capitano) aria for bass and orchestra (1775), for?
- "Quest'è un mar di confusione" quartet for sopran, alto, tenor, bass and orchestra, for?
- "Rasserena nel tuo barbaro" fragmentary aria, for?
- "Sans argent et sans crédit" (Boschetto - Pirati - Lauretta) scene with orchestra (1768), for?
- "Scomodarmi da palazzo e trattarmi in questa guisa" aria in F major for soprano and orchestra (1775), for?
- "Se amor m'ha dato in testa, se mi far delirare" aria for soprano and orchestra (1776), for?
- "Se credessi di volare" (Peppino) aria in E♭ major for bass and orchestra (1774), for?
- "Se Dio veder tu vuoi" (Achio - Azia) duet, for?
- "Se tu vedessi il core" (Isabella) aria in G major for soprano and strings, for B. Galuppi's "Il villano geloso"
- "Signor mio scrivete bene" (Pasquino) aria in F major for bass and orchestra (1775), for A. Felici's "La novità"?
- "S'odo, o duce" (Epponina - Voadice - Sabino - Arminio - Annio) finale of an opera (1785?), for G. Sarti's "Giulio Sabino"
- "Son dama, ma so l'arte ancor delle plebe" (Polissena) aria in B♭ major for soprano and orchestra (1774), for G. Paisiello's "Il tamburo (notturno)"
- "Son nipote d'un togato" (Isabella) aria in F major for soprano and strings, for B. Galuppi's "Il villano geloso"
- "Talor non si comprende" aria for bass and orchestra, for?
- "Tenero cor" recitative and cavatina for soprano and orchestra (1780), for?
- "Tu che ferita sei" aria for tenor and orchestra, for "Il barone di Rocca antica"?
- "Tutte le furie unite in questo petto io sento" aria for soprano and orchestra (1776), for?
- "Tutti dicon che la moglie" aria for bass and orchestra, for?
- "Una domina? una nipote?" - see: aria "Affé questa saria grandissima" -
- "Un bel marito" aria for soprano and orchestra, for?
- "Un pescatore mi pare amore" aria for bass and orchestra, for?
- "Vedi ben che queste scene" trio for soprano, alto, bass and orchestra, for?
- "Venga su la finestra" aria for tenor, choir and orchestra, for?
- "Venissi cari, l'affare è serio" (Patenio) aria for bass and orchestra (1777), for?
- "Verdammter Streich" (Mauser) aria for tenor and orchestra, for?
- "[...] vicino a perdere l'amato ben" fragmentary aria, for?
- "Villottino mio bellino" (Lisetta) aria for alto and orchestra (1775), for?
- aria (Polissena) for soprano and orchestra (1774), for G. Paisiello's "Il tamburo (notturno)"
- finale of an opera for three sopranos, two tenors, bass and orchester (1779), for "La scuola de'gelosi"?

== Ballets and incidental music ==
- Ballet in 7 movements for "L'Europa riconosciuta" (1778)
- Ballet in 16 movements
- Ballet in 10 movements
- Ballet in 8 movements
- Fragmentary ballet
- Overture, four incidental pieces and nine choirs for "Die Hussiten vor Naumburg" by August von Kotzebue (1803)

== Secular cantatas ==
- Cantata per le nozze di Francesco I for soloists, choir and orchestra (1808)
- Der Tyroler Landsturm for soprano, alto, tenor, bass, double choir, orchestra and speaker (1799)
- Die vier Tageszeiten for choir and orchestra (1819)
- Du, dieses Bundes Fels for choir and orchestra
- Habsburg for tenor, bass, choir and orchestra (1805/06)
- Il Trionfo della Gloria e della Virtù for two sopranos, tenor, choir and orchestra (1774 or 1775)
- La Riconoscenza for soprano, choir of five voices and orchestra (1796)
- La Riconoscenza de' Tirolesi for choir and Orchester (1800)
- La Sconfitta di Borea for soloists, choir and orchestra (1774 or 1775)
- Lasset uns nahen alle for tenor, bass, choir and Orchester
- Le Jugement dernier for tenor, choir and orchestra (1787/88)
- L'Oracolo muto for soloists, choir and orchestra (1802/03)
- Wie eine purpur Blume for two sopranos, choir and orchestra

== Secular choirs ==
- "An den erwünschten Frieden im Jahr 1814" for choir and orchestra (1814)
- "An die Religion" for choir a cappella (1814) - there is also a version for SATB choir with basso continuo. This work was intended for choir and orchestra, but in manuscript, only 1st Violin part is noted occasionally.
- "Bei Gelegenheit des Friedens" for soprano solo, tenor, bass and orchestra (1800)
- "Beide reichen Dir die Hand" for choir - fragment -
- "Del redentore lo scempio" for choir and orchestra (ca. 1805)
- "Der Vorsicht Gunst beschütze, beglücktes Österreich, dich" for choir and orchestra (1813) - new version of the final movement of "Der Tyroler Landsturm" (1799) -
- "Dio serva Francesco" for choir and orchestra
- "Do re mi fa" for choir a cappella (1818)
- "Es schallen die Töne" for choir and orchestra
- "Herzliche Empfindung bey dem so lange ersehnten und nun hergestellten Frieden im Jahr 1814" for choir and orchestra (1814)
- "O Friede, reich am Heil des Herrn" - see: "Herzliche Empfindung bey dem so lange ersehnten und nun hergestellten Frieden im Jahr 1814" -
- "Hinab in den Schoß der Amphitrite" for choir and orchestra (from "Danaus"?)
- "Il piacer la gioia" for choir and orchestra
- "Ogni bosco, ogni pendice" for choir and orchestra
- "Religion, Du Himmelstochter" - see: "An die Religion" -
- "Schweb herab, o holder Seraph Friede" - see: "An den erwünschten Frieden im Jahr 1814" -
- "Schwer lag auf unserem Vaterlande" - see: "Rückerinnerung der Deutschen nell'anno 1813" -
- "Rückerinnerung der Deutschen nell'anno 1813" for choir and orchestra (1813/14)
- Songs, ensembles and canons with or without piano - approximately 340 works -

== Sacred vocal music ==
=== Oratories and sacred cantatas ===
- Davidde for soloists, choir and orchestra (1791) - fragment -
- Gesù al limbo for soloists, choir and orchestra (1803)
- La passione di Gesù Cristo for soloists, choir and Orchester (1776)
- Le Jugement dernier for tenor, choir and orchestra (1787/88) - see above -
- Saul for soloists, choir and orchestra (1791) - fragment -

=== Masses and single movements ===
- Mass in C major for choir a Cappella (1767) - also known as Missa Stylo a Cappella
- Mass in D major for choir and orchestra (1788) - called Hofkapellmeistermesse
- Mass in C major for double choir and orchestra (1799) - called Proklamationsmesse
- Mass in D minor for soloists, choir and orchestra (1805)
- Mass in B♭ major for soloists, choir and orchestra (1809)
- Kyrie in C major for soloists, choir and orchestra (1812) - part of an unfinished mass -
- Kyrie in F major for choir and orchestra - a fragment -

=== Requiem masses ===
- Requiem in C minor for soloists, choir and orchestra (1804)
- Requiem in D minor for choir and orchestra (c. 1815–20) - fragment -

=== Graduals ===
- "Ad te levavi animam meam" in E♭ major for choir and orchestra
- "A solis ortu" pro Festo SS. Corporis Christi, in C major for choir and orchestra (1810)
- "Benedicam Dominum" pro Dominica 12ma post Pentecostem aut de Tempore, in B♭ major for choir and orchestra
- "Improperium" in c minor for choir a Cappella (1810)
- "Justorum animae" in A major for choir and orchestra
- "Liberasti nos, Domine" pro Dominica XXIII. et ultima post Pentecostem, in D major for choir and orchestra (1799)
- "Magna opera Domini" da tempore, in D major for choir and orchestra (1810)
- "Spiritus meus" in d minor for choir and orchestra (1820)
- "Tres sunt, qui testimonium dant in coelo" de SS. Trinitate, in D major for choir and orchestra
- "Veni Sancte Spiritus" in B♭ major for choir and orchestra (1800)
- "Veni Sancte Spiritus" pro Festo Pentecostem, in B♭ major for choir and orchestra (1805)
- "Venite gentes" in C major for double choir and orchestra (1799)
- "Vox tua mi Jesu" in C major for choir and orchestra (1774)

=== Offertories ===
- "Alleluja (deinde) Bonum est" in D major for choir, strings and organ
- "Alleluja" in D major for choir and orchestra (1774) - 1788 reused as "Amen"-Fugue in the "Gloria" of the Mass in D major -
- "Assumpta est Maria" in C major for choir and orchestra (1799)
- "Audite vocem magnam" in C major for Chor und orchestra (1809)
- "Beatus vir, qui non abit" in D major for soloists, choir and orchestra
- "Benedixisti Domine" in F major for choir a cappella
- "Benedixisti Domine" in F major for choir a cappella
- "Cantate Domino omnis terra" in C major for double choir and orchestra (1799)
- "Confirma hoc Deus" in C major for soloists, choir and orchestra (1809)
- "Desiderium animae" in F major for soprano, alto, bass and orchestra
- "Domine, Dominus noster" in G major for choir and orchestra (1812)
- "Dum corde pio" in C major for choir, double-bass and organ
- "Excelsus super omnes gentes Dominus" in C major for choir and orchestra (1806)
- "Gloria et honor(e)" in C major for choir and orchestra (1809)
- "Jubilate Deo" in A major for choir and orchestra
- "Justus ut palma" in B♭ major for choir and orchestra
- "Lauda Sion Salvatorem" in C major for choir and orchestra (1805)
- "Laudate Dominum omnes gentes" in D major for choir and orchestra (1809)
- "Magna et mirabilia sunt opera tua" in C major for choir and orchestra (1809)
- "Magna opera Domini" in C major for chor and orchestra (1812)
- "Miserere nostri" in g minor for choir and orchestra (1805)
- "Miserere nostri" in E♭ major for choir and orchestra (1803)
- "O altitudo divitiarium" in C major for choir and orchestra (1809)
- "O quam bonus et suavis est" in B♭ major for soloists, choir and orchestra
- "Populi timente sanctum nomen Domini" in E♭ major choir and orchestra (1778)
- "Salve Regina" in D major for choir and orchestra (1815)
- "Salve Regina" (on German words) in G major for choir and organ
- "Salve Regina" in B♭ major for choir and orchestra
- "Salvum fac populum" (1805) - lost -
- "Si ambulavero in medio" in g minor for choir and orchestra (1809)
- "Sub tuum praesidium" in B♭ major for choir and orchestra (1820)
- "Tui sunt coeli" in C major for choir and orchestra
- "Tui sunt coeli" in E♭ major for choir and orchestra

=== Psalms ===
- Beatus vir qui timet Dominum (Psalm 112) in D major for two tenors, choir and orchestra
- Confitebor Domine in B♭ major for choir and orchestra
- De profundis (Psalm 130) in F minor for choir, bass and organ (1815)
- De profundis in G minor for choir and orchestra (1805)
- Dixit Dominus (Psalm 110) in G major for choir and orchestra
- Lauda Jerusalem Dominum (Psalm 147) in C major for choir and orchestra (1815)
- Laudate pueri Dominum (Psalm 113) in G major for choir of six voices and orchestra

=== Canticles ===
- Magnificat in C major for choir and orchestra (1815)
- Magnificat in F major for two-part choir and orchestra (1815)

=== Litanies ===
- Litania di B.M.V. in F major for soloists, choir and orchestra
- Litania pro Sabbato Sancto in B♭ major for choir a cappella (1820)

=== Hymns ===
- "Coelestis urbs Jerusalem" Hymnus de dedicatione Ecclesiae, in A major for choir and orchestra
- "Genitori" in F major for soprano, choir and orchestra
- "In te Domine speravi" in E♭ major for two sopranos and bass (1817)
- "Tantum ergo" in C major for double choir, two clarinets, four horns, four trumpets (Clarini), timpani, double-bass and organ
- "Tantum ergo" in C major for choir, two oboes, two bassoons, four trumpets (Clarini), timpani and organ
- "Tantum ergo" in C major for choir, two trumpets (Clarini), timpani and organ
- "Tantum ergo" in F major for soprano and strings (1768)
- "Te Deum laudamus" in C major for soloists, choir and orchestra (1819)
- "Te Deum laudamus" de Incoronazione, in D major for choir and orchestra (1790)
- "Te Deum laudamus" in D major for double choir and orchestra (1799) - new version of the "Te Deum" from 1790 -

=== Introitus ===
- "Avertisti captivitatem Jacob" pro Dominica XXIII. et XXIV. post Pentecostem, in B♭ major for choir, strings and organ
- "Beati immaculati" de Virginibus et Martyribus et de Sancto Stephano, in F major for choir, strings and organ
- "Concupiscit et deficit" in dedicatione Ecclesia et in Festo Tranfigurationis Domini, in F major for choir, strings and organ
- "Dico ergo" pro Festis Beatae Mariae Virginis, in d minor for choir, strings and organ
- "Domine exaudi vocem meam" pro Dominica XXII. post Pentecostem, in F major for choir, strings and organ
- "Et justitiam tuam" pro Festo Epiphaniae, in d minor for choir, strings and organ
- "Et psallare" pro Festo S. Joannis Apost. et S. Joannis Bapt., in B♭ major for choir, strings and organ
- "Inductus est Dominus" pro Dominica infra octavem Nativitas Domini et ad secundam missam, in F major for choir, strings and organ
- "In civitate" pro Festo Purificationis Mariae et Dominica VIII. post Pentecostem, in C major for choir, strings and organ
- "In mandatis ejus" de Confessore et in Festo Sancti Joachim, in g minor for choir, strings and organ
- "Jubilate Deo Jacob" pro Dominica in albis, pro Feria II. post Pentecostem et in solemnitate corporis Christi, in d minor for choir, strings and organ
- "Jubilate Deo" pro Festo St. Januarii Episcopus et Mart., pro Festo Ascensionis Domini, in F major for choir, strings and organ
- "Laetentur insulae" pro Dominica III., IV., V., VI. post Epiphaniam, in F major for choir, strings and organ
- "Ne quando taceas" pro Dominica VI. post Pentecostem, in d minor for choir, strings and organ
- "Neque celaveris" de Confessore, in B♭ major for choir, strings and organ
- "Quam admirabile est nomen tuum" pro Festo Sanctissime Trinitatis, in d minor for choir, strings and organ
- "Tu cognovisti" pro Festo Sanctorum Apostolorum, in d minor for choir, strings and organ

=== Motets and sacred arias and chants ===
- "Audimus Dei verbum" - lost -
- "Contra vos, o monstra horrenda" in B♭ major, motet for soprano, choir and orchestra (1769)
- "Cor meum conturbatum" in g minor for choir and orchestra
- "Ecce enim veritatem" in G major for bass, three violas, double-bass and organ
- "Fremat tirannus" in C major, motet for soprano, choir and orchestra (1778)
- "Magna est virtus" - lost -
- "Misericordius Dominus" in E♭ major, duet for soprano, bass, violine and orchestra
- "O mortales, festinate" in B♭ major, aria for soprano, clarinet and orchestra
- "Quae est illa" in B♭ major, aria in honorem B.V.M. for soprano, oboe, strings and organ
- "Quem terra pontus sidera" in A major for soprano and orchestra
- "Salve Jesu pie" duet - lost -
- "Tu es spes mea, Domine" for soprano, flute, oboe and orchestra

== Instrumental music ==
=== Concerti ===
- Concerto for oboe, violin, violoncello and orchestra in D major (1770)
- Concerto for organ and orchestra in C major (1773) - second movement lost -
- Concerto for piano and orchestra in C major (1773)
- Concerto for piano and orchestra in B♭ major (1773)
- Concerto for flute, oboe and orchestra in C major (1774)
- Concertino da camera for flute or oboe and strings G major (1777)

=== Symphonies, overtures and variations ===
- Symphonie in D major "Il Giorno onomastico" (1775)
- Symphonie in D major "La Veneziana" (built from overtures to "La Scuola de'gelosi" and "La Partenza inaspettata")
- Three minuets for orchestra
- 26 Variations on "La Follia di Spagna" for orchestra (1815)
- Allegretto in D major for orchestra
- Symphonie (ouverture) in C major - overture to "Habsburg" -
- Overture "La Frascatana"
- Fragmentary Symphonie (overture) in G major
- Fragmentary movement for bassoons and strings

=== Serenades ===
- Picciola Serenata in B♭ major for 2 oboes, 2 horns and bassoon (1778)
- Serenade in B♭ major for 2 clarinets, 2 bassoons, 2 horns and double-bass
- Serenade in C major for 2 flutes, 2 oboes, 2 bassoons, 2 horns and double-bass (alternative version of the serenade in B♭ major for seven instruments)
- Serenade in F major for 2 flutes, 2 oboes, 2 bassoons, 2 horns and double-bass
- Cassation in C major for 2 oboes, 2 English horns, 2 bassoons and 2 horns
- Three trios in G major, E♭ major and C major for 2 Oboes and bassoon
- Armonia per un tempio della notte in E♭ major for 2 oboes, 2 clarinets, 2 bassoons and 2 horns (ca. 1795)

=== Marches ===
- 11 Marches for orchestra (ca. 1804)
- March for wind ensemble "Prägt tief in eure Herzen, Brüder"
- "Parademarsch" in C major for wind ensemble
- March "Die Landwehr" (1809)
- March in honour of Gassmann in C major for orchestra (1820)

=== Chamber music ===
- 4 Scherzi armonici istrumentali for string quartet
- Fugue for string quartet (tema H.! b.e.n. Die m. ist ein s. Ma non il testo)
- Fugue for three instruments
- Fugue in C major for two instruments (1818)
- Fugue in E♭ major for two instruments (Tema Kerscorchiano)
- 6 little pieces for piano
- 6 pieces for guitar - lost -

== Revisions of other composers' works and joint compositions with other composers ==
- "La Betulia liberata" by Florian Leopold Gassmann: abridgements in recitatives and arias, and additional choirs taken from other compositions of Gassmann's (1820)
- "Il Talismano": joint composition by Salieri (first act) and Giacomo Rust (second and third act) (1779)
- "Iphigénie en Tauride" by Christoph Willibald Gluck: Italian version called "Ifigenia in Tauride" in Lorenzo Da Ponte's translation (1783)
- "Per la ricuperata salute di Ofelia" for voice and piano: joint composition by Salieri, Mozart and Cornetti (1785)
- "Requiem" by Niccolò Jommelli: additional instrumentation of two oboes, two bassoons and two trombones (for Christoph Willibald Gluck's solemn requiem on April 8, 1788)
- "Stabat Mater" in F minor by Giovanni Battista Pergolesi: version for soloists, choir and orchestra, instrumentation by Franz Xaver Süssmayr
