= L'amore innocente =

Opera by Antonio Salieri

- Opera by Antonio Salieri
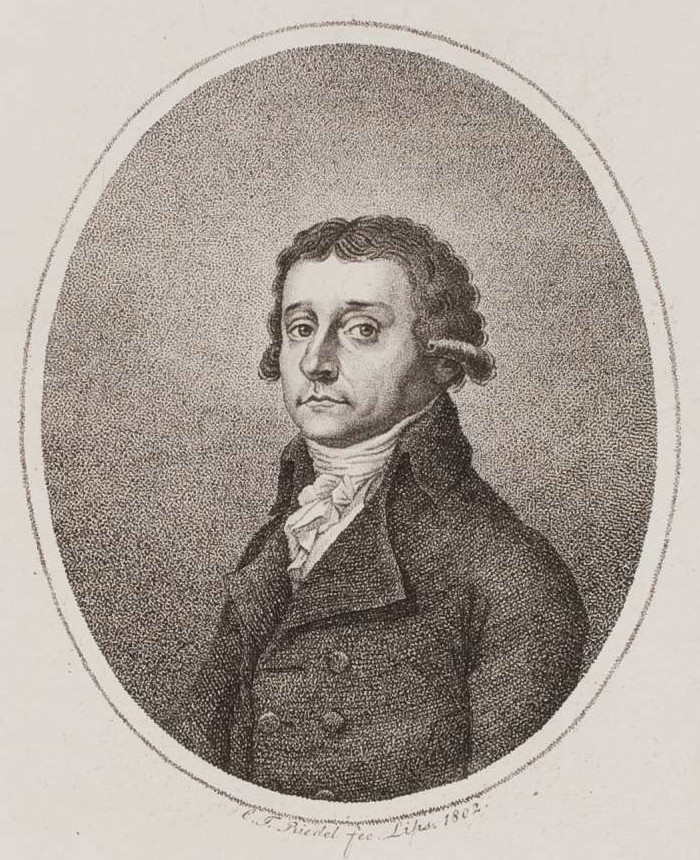
- Antonio Salieri, engraving by Carl Traugott Riedel, 1802
- Translation: Innocent Love
- Librettist: Giovanni Gastone Boccherini
- Language: Italian
- Premiere: 1770; Burgtheater, Vienna

L'amore innocente (Innocent Love) composed by Antonio Salieri (1750–1825), is an Italian-language opera in two acts. Stylistically, it is a pastoral opera and is very similar to the mid-18th-century Roman Intermezzo. The libretto was written by Giovanni Gastone Boccherini, dancer, poet and stage manager, brother of the composer Luigi Boccherini.

This opera was the second of Salieri's to be publicly performed, as well as his second collaboration with Boccherini. This was Salieri's third complete opera.

== Performance history ==
Salieri wrote L'amore innocent in Vienna in 1770. It received its first performance during Carnival that same year at the Imperial Burgtheater in Vienna. In 1772, the opera premiered in Dresden. This performance was witnessed by Charles Burney, and included Angiola Calori in the cast. Salieri later reused some of the music from this opera in various unnamed ballet scores, as well as one aria in the late opera La cifra. Salieri seems to have continued to revise this opera late into his life; performances frequently occurred in German translation as Die Lügnerin aus Liebe under the direction of Gustav Friedrich Wilhelm Großmann in 1783 in Bonn and in Mainz, Dresden (this time in German), both in 1783, 1785 in Frankfurt, and Berlin in 1788; a performance as late as 1793 has been reported. The first modern production was in 1997 in Bolzano.

== Roles ==
Role	Voice type	Premiere cast, Carnival, 1770 (Conductor: Antonio Salieri (most likely))
Despino, A shepherd, in love with Despina	tenor	
Despina, Niece of Cestone, also his pupil	soprano	Clementina Baglioni
Cestone, (Basket) Head shepherd of the village, father of Guidalba	bass	
Guidalba, Daughter of Cestone, also in love with Despino	soprano	

== Synopsis ==
Time: the 18th century
Place: the village of Klausen in the County of Tyrol.

Summary: The plot revolves around two rural maids, Guidalba the worldly daughter of the village's head Shepherd, Cestone (Basket) and his ward and niece, Despina. Despina is a happy country maiden in love with a local shepherd Despino, Guidalba is also in love with Despino, but is resolved to abandon the Alps and the rustic life for a more exciting life in the city. Guidalba engages in a number of subterfuges to break the romantic tie between Despino and Despina, which until the very end of the opera the audience is led to believe have succeeded, mainly because Despino is portrayed as utterly clueless and gullible. At the very end, however, Despino and Despina are reunited in love and promise to wed and spend the remainder of their days in the countryside.

== Structure, genre, critical reception ==
This opera by Salieri and Boccherini was written in the pastoral tradition; the printed libretto for the premiere in Vienna carries the description pastorale per musica, and Salieri's autograph score uses the term "operetta" and "pastorale". These details, plus its very small structure – two acts with only four singers – has led several scholars to place it within the tradition of Roman Intermezzo. Also unique to this opera is its choice of setting. Instead of the more typical lush southern Italian placement, L'amore is set in an Alpine village; and very unusually, it is set in the specific village of Klausen, located between Brixen and Bolzano on the river Eisack. The village is now part of Italy, but at the time of the opera's composition it was part of the Habsburg domains.

The work itself consists mainly of arias and cavatinas with very few ensembles. Mosel, Salieri's first biographer and the main source for primary information about the composer, praised this short and early work; writing of the libretto, he wrote, "this operetta is distinguished by its simple but attractive plot and the naivete of the language." Further, Mosel noted that the music of the work is marked by flowing, pastoral melodies and pleasant tunes. The character of Despina, however, borrows bravura coloratura writing from the opera seria tradition. Mosel saw this use of coloratura as a weakness and a threat to the opera's musical cohesion. He attributed its use to concessions made to please the lead soprano, Clementina Baglioni, however Braunbehrens sees it as a both within the character of Despina, as a woman who is noble at heart, and perhaps as a naive attempt at local color: yodeling as coloratura, similar to its use 70 years later in Donizetti's La fille du régiment which is also set in the Alps. Besides elements of pastoral music, and bravura arias, Salieri and Boccherini also included a catalog aria in the style of Carlo Goldoni and falsetto sung by the bass Cestone for comic effect. Charles Burney gave his opinion of the piece at a performance in Dresden in 1772, writing, "The music was as innocent of design, as the drama and the performance: nothing in the least seducing or inflammatory was to be heard or seen; but all was tranquil, unmeaning, and as truly soporific as a nurse's lullaby." An opposing view of this small work was held by Goethe; in a letter to Charlotte von Stein, dated 5 November 1785, he praised a performance of the opera, calling it charming and recommended that they go together to see it.

In this opera Salieri matured as a composer. Building on his experience from his first staged opera Le donne letterate, in L'amore Salieri greatly expanded the harmonic and orchestral role of the viola. Mosel further remarks that the composer also used a more active harmonic bass line, and greatly improved his use of modulation within individual numbers of this opera. These compositional advances moved well beyond what was typical for a small scale Italian opera of this period. The public received the opera with applause, and it has been judged a modest success in Vienna at the time of its premiere.

== Noted arias ==
- "Ah se foss'io smarrito" – Despina in act 1, with extended oboe solo, later prepared for insertion in the opera Il mondo alla rovescia, but left out of the final score.
- "Non vo' gia che vi suonino" – Guidalba in act 2, later reworked and inserted in La cifra.

== Recordings ==
There is no known studio recording of the complete opera; however, The Salieri Album, (Cecilia Bartoli with the Orchestra of the Age of Enlightenment, conducted by Ádám Fischer, Decca 475 100–2) has one related excerpt:

- "E voi da buon marito ... Non vo' gia che vi suonino" (Lisotta's recitative and aria from act 1 from La cifra; this is the reworked version of Guidalba's aria "Ah se foss'io smarrito" from act 2 of L'amore innocente.
