= La fiera di Venezia =

Opera by Antonio Salieri

- Opera buffa by Antonio Salieri
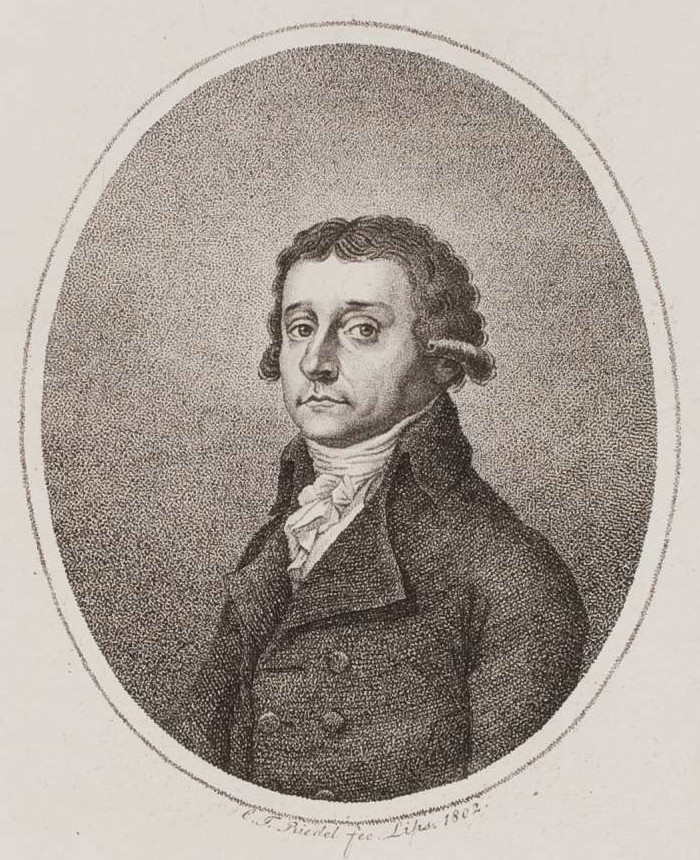
- Antonio Salieri, engraving by Carl Traugott Riedel, 1802
- Translation: The fair in Venice
- Librettist: Giovanni Gastone Boccherini
- Language: Italian
- Premiere: 29 January 1772; Burgtheater, Vienna

La fiera di Venezia (The fair in Venice) is a three-act opera buffa, described as a commedia per musica, by Antonio Salieri, set to an Italian libretto by Giovanni Gastone Boccherini (brother of the composer Luigi Boccherini).

== Performance history ==
The opera premiered with great success on 29 January 1772 at the Burgtheater in Vienna. La fiera di Venezia turned out to be one of Salieri's best regarded works and during his lifetime was staged more than thirty times throughout Europe. In 1773, Mozart wrote fortepiano variations to the aria "Mio caro adone". In the movie Amadeus, Mozart refers to the piece when introducing himself to Salieri. He called the aria, “a funny little tune but it yielded some good things”.

== Roles ==
Roles, voice types
Role	Voice type
Falsirena	soprano
Calloandra	soprano
Cristallina	soprano
Ostrogoto	tenor
Rasoio	tenor
Cecchino	tenor
Grifagno	bass
Belfusto	bass

== Recordings ==
- Complete recording – Falsirena: Francesca Lombardi Mazzulli, Grifagno: Furio Zanasi; Calloandra: Dilyara Idrisova, Ostrogoto: Krystian Adam, Cristallina: Natalia Rubiś, Rasojo: Emanuele D'Aguanno, Belfusto: Giorgio Caoduro; choir and Orchestra l'arte del mondo, Werner Ehrhardt DHM 2CD 2019
