= Le donne letterate =

Opera by Antonio Salieri

- Opera by Antonio Salieri
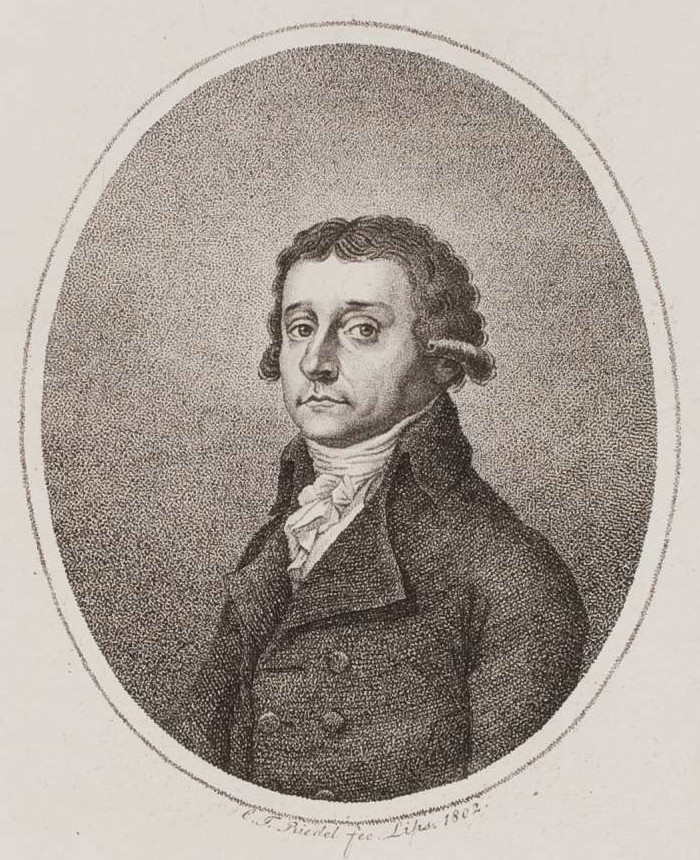
- Antonio Salieri, engraving by Carl Traugott Riedel, 1802
- Translation: The Learned Ladies
- Librettist: Giovanni Gastone Boccherini
- Language: Italian
- Based on: Molière's Les Femmes Savantes
- Premiere: 1770; Imperial theatre, Vienna

Le donne letterate, composed by Antonio Salieri, is an Italian opera in three acts. Stylistically it is an opera buffa and is very similar to the mid-18th century librettos of Carlo Goldoni. The libretto by Giovanni Gastone Boccherini, dancer, poet and stage manager, brother of the composer Luigi Boccherini, was based on Molière's Les Femmes Savantes (The Learned Ladies).

This opera was the first of Salieri's to be publicly performed, as well as his first collaboration with Boccherini. This was Salieri's second complete opera.

== Performance history ==
Salieri, wrote Le donne letterate in Vienna in late 1769 and early 1770. It received its first performance during Carnival that same year at one of the Imperial theaters in Vienna. There is some dispute among scholars as to the date and place of the premiere. Rudolph Angermüller lists 10 January 1770 in the Burgtheater as the first performance. The opera was apparently revived only once, in Prague in 1773. There is no known modern performance history.

== Roles ==
Role	Voice type	Premiere cast, Carnival, 1770 (Conductor: Antonio Salieri)
Don Baggeo, A wealthy old man	bass	
Donna Artemia, Don Baggeo's wife	soprano	Clementina Baglioni
Donna Elvira, Sister of Artemia	soprano	
Corilla, Daughter of Donna Elvira, and the niece of Donna Aremia, a pupil of Don Baggeo	soprano	
Don Prudenzio, Brother of Don Baggeo in love with Corilla	tenor	
Don Vertiginie, An effeminate and ridiculous poet, also in love with Corilla	tenor	Gioachino Caribaldi?
Don Trimetro (sp?), A Scholar and Professor, also in love with Corilla	bass	
Don Filiberto, Don Baggeo's tutor	Unknown	
Commissioner of the Curiale, The local head of police	Unknown	
Choruses: Depicting servants of Don Baggeo, the local literati, friends of Don Prudenzio dressed in doctoral gowns, students of Don Trimetro dressed in the red gowns, and the local police	mixed voices	

== Recordings ==
There is no known studio recording of the complete opera, or excerpts.
