= Armida (Salieri) =

Opera by Antonio Salieri

- Dramma per musica by Antonio Salieri
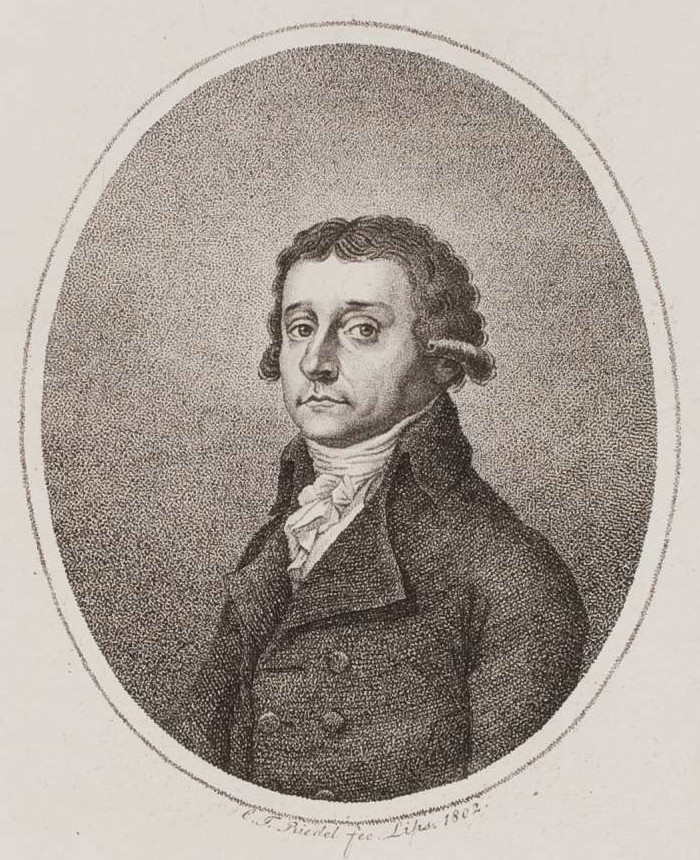
- Antonio Salieri, engraving by Carl Traugott Riedel, 1802
- Librettist: Marco Coltellini
- Language: Italian
- Based on: Torquato Tasso's Gerusalemme liberata.
- Premiere: 2 June 1771; Burgtheater, Vienna

Armida (Italian pronunciation: [arˈmiːda]) is an operatic dramma per musica by Antonio Salieri in three acts, set to a libretto by Marco Coltellini. The plot is based on the epic poem Gerusalemme liberata by Torquato Tasso. Lully, Handel and Traetta, to name but a few, had already composed operas based on the situations that Tasso originally developed. The plot of all of these, and Salieri's work, is based on the relationship between Armida and the Crusader Rinaldo.

Salieri's opera was first performed at the Vienna Burgtheater on 2 June 1771, and his composition was much influenced by the aesthetics of Christoph Willibald Gluck, who attempted to reform opera seria by tying the drama more closely to the music. Salieri's overture follows the principles set out by Gluck in the preface to Alceste. Other Gluckian influences display themselves in the frequent interplay of soloist and chorus, and the heavy use of chorus overall. Nonetheless, Gluck himself would also go on to produce his own adaptation of the story six years later.

== Roles ==
Cast	Voice type	Premiere, June 2, 1771 (Conductor: - )
Armida	soprano	Catharina Schindler
Ismene	soprano	
Rinaldo	soprano castrato	Giuseppe Millico ?
Ubaldo	tenor	

== Recordings ==
- Armida : Lenneke Ruiten (Armida), Teresa Iervolino (Ismene), Florie Valiquette (Rinaldo), Ashley Riches (Ubaldo) Les Talens Lyriques, Chœur de Chambre de Namur, Christophe Rousset. 22nd Jan 2021 AP244 Aparté
