= Antonio Salieri =

Italian composer and teacher (1750–1825)

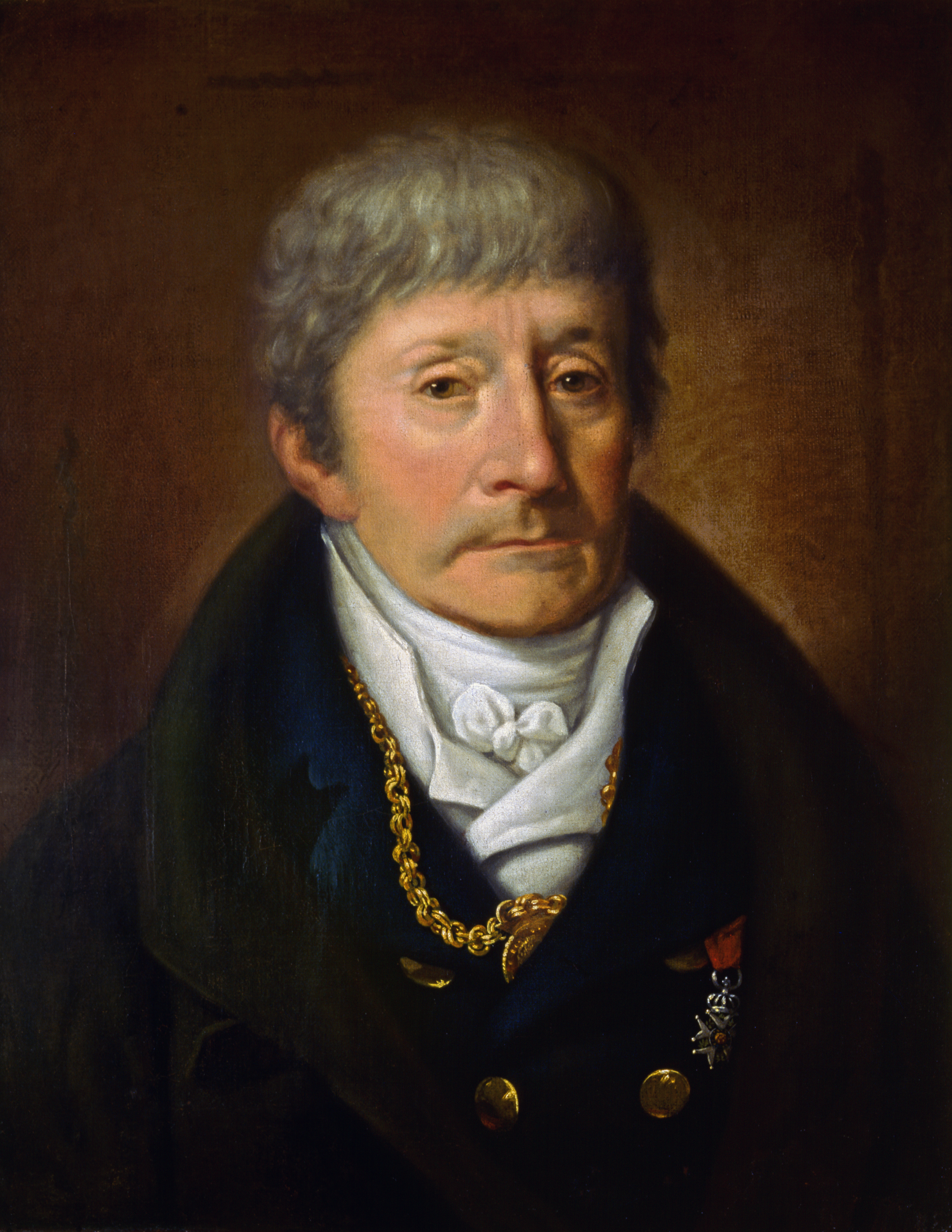
- Portrait by Joseph Willibrord Mähler, c. 1815
- Born: 18 August 1750; Legnago, Republic of Venice
- Died: 7 May 1825 (aged 74); Vienna, Austrian Empire
- Occupations: Composer; music teacher
- Works: List of compositions
- Spouse: Eva Maria Theresia von Helferstorfer (m. 1775; died 1807)
- Children: 8
- Family: Salieri

Antonio Salieri (Note: English: UK: /ˌsæliˈɛəri/ SAL-ee-AIR-ee, US: /sɑːlˈjɛəri/ sahl-YAIR-ee, Italian: [anˈtɔːnjo saˈljɛːri].) (18 August 1750 – 7 May 1825) was an Italian composer and teacher of the classical period.

Salieri was a pivotal figure in the development of late 18th-century opera. A student of Florian Leopold Gassmann and a protégé of Christoph Willibald Gluck, Salieri was a cosmopolitan composer who wrote operas in three languages. He helped to shape operatic compositional vocabulary, and his music was a powerful influence on contemporary composers.

Salieri was born in Legnago, south of Verona, in the Republic of Venice, and spent his adult life and career as a subject of the Habsburg monarchy. Appointed the director of the Italian opera by the Habsburg court at age 24, he dominated Italian-language opera in Vienna until he relinquished the post in 1792. During his career, he also wrote works for opera houses in Paris, Rome, and Venice, and his dramatic works were widely performed throughout Europe during his lifetime. As the Austrian imperial Kapellmeister from 1788 to 1824, he was responsible for music at the court chapel and attached school. He wrote no operas after 1804, but remained one of the most important and sought-after teachers of his generation, with influence throughout Viennese musical life. Among his pupils were Franz Liszt, Franz Schubert, Ludwig van Beethoven, Anton Eberl, Johann Nepomuk Hummel, and Franz Xaver Wolfgang Mozart.

Salieri's music slowly disappeared from the repertoire between 1800 and 1868; it was rarely heard until a revival of his fame in the late 20th century, due in part to the fictionalized depiction of Salieri in Peter Shaffer's play Amadeus (1979) and its 1984 film version.

The death of Wolfgang Amadeus Mozart in 1791 at the age of 35 was followed by rumors that he and Salieri had been bitter rivals, and that Salieri had poisoned the younger composer; however, this has been disproved because the symptoms displayed by Mozart's illness did not indicate poisoning and it is likely that they were, at least, mutually respectful peers.

== Life and career ==
=== Early life (1750–1770) ===
Antonio Salieri was born on 18 August 1750 to Antonio Salieri and his wife, Anna Maria. Salieri started his musical studies in his native town of Legnago; he was first taught at home by his older brother Francesco Salieri (a former student of the violinist and composer Giuseppe Tartini), and he received further lessons from the organist of the Legnago Cathedral, Giuseppe Simoni, a pupil of Padre Giovanni Battista Martini. Salieri remembered little from his childhood in later years except for passions for sugar, reading, and music. He twice ran away from home without permission to hear his elder brother play violin concertos in neighboring churches on festival days and he recounted being chastised by his father after failing to greet a local priest with proper respect. Salieri responded to the reprimand by saying the priest's organ playing displeased him because it was in an inappropriately theatrical style.

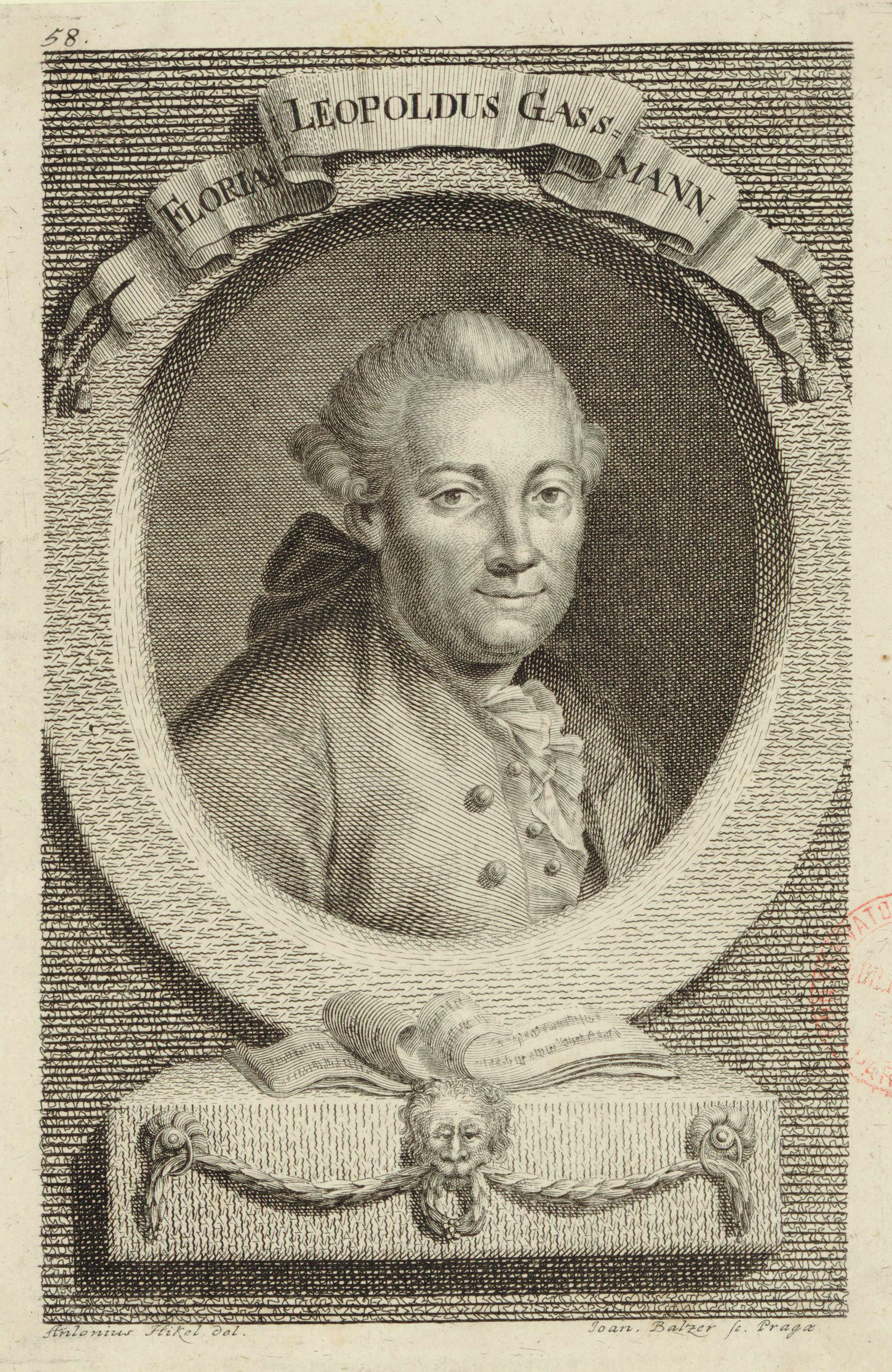
Salieri's teacher Florian Leopold Gassmann in an engraving (1775) by Johann Balzer

Between 1763 and 1764, both of Salieri's parents died, and he was briefly taken in by an anonymous brother, a monk in Padua, and then for unknown reasons in 1765 or 1766, he became the ward of a Venetian nobleman named Giovanni Mocenigo (which Giovanni is at this time unknown), a member of the powerful and well connected Mocenigo family. It is possible that Salieri's father and Mocenigo were friends or business associates, but this is obscure. While living in Venice, Salieri continued his musical studies with the organist and opera composer Giovanni Battista Pescetti, then following Pescetti's sudden death he studied with the opera singer Ferdinando Pacini (or Pasini). It was through Pacini that Salieri gained the attention of the composer Florian Leopold Gassmann, who, impressed with his protege's talents and concerned for the boy's future, took the young orphan to Vienna, where he personally directed and paid for the remainder of Salieri's musical education.

Salieri and Gassmann arrived in Vienna on 15 June 1766. Gassmann's first act was to take Salieri to the Italian Church to consecrate his teaching and service to God, an event that left a deep impression on Salieri for the rest of his life. Salieri's education included instruction in Latin and Italian poetry by Fr. Don Pietro Tommasi, instruction in the German language, and European literature. His music studies revolved around vocal composition and thoroughbass. His musical theory training in harmony and counterpoint was rooted in Johann Fux's Gradus ad Parnassum, which Salieri translated during each Latin lesson. As a result, Salieri continued to live with Gassmann even after Gassmann's marriage, an arrangement that lasted until the year of Gassmann's death and Salieri's own marriage in 1774.

Few of Salieri's compositions have survived from this early period. In his old age Salieri hinted that these works were either purposely destroyed or had been lost, with the exception of a few works for the church. Among these sacred works there survives a Mass in C major written without a "Gloria" and in the antique a cappella style (presumably for one of the church's penitential seasons) and dated 2 August 1767. A complete opera composed in 1769 (presumably as a culminating study) La vestal (The Vestal Virgin) has also been lost.

Beginning in 1766, Gassmann introduced Salieri to the daily chamber music performances held during Emperor Joseph II's evening meal. Salieri quickly impressed the Emperor, and Gassmann was instructed to bring his pupil as often as he wished. This was the beginning of a relationship between monarch and musician that lasted until Joseph's death in 1790. Salieri met Pietro Antonio Domenico Trapassi, better known as Metastasio, and Christoph Willibald Gluck during this period at the Sunday morning salons held at the home of the Martinez family. Metastasio had an apartment there and participated in the weekly gatherings. Over the next several years, Metastasio gave Salieri informal instruction in prosody and the declamation of Italian poetry, and Gluck became an informal advisor, friend, and confidante.

It was toward the end of this extended period of study that Gassmann was called away on a new opera commission and a gap in the theater's program allowed for Salieri to make his debut as a composer of a completely original opera buffa. Salieri's first full opera was composed during the winter and carnival season of 1770; Le donne letterate and was based on Molière's Les Femmes Savantes (The Learned Ladies) with a libretto by Giovanni Gastone Boccherini, a dancer in the court ballet and a brother of the composer Luigi Boccherini. The modest success of this opera launched Salieri's 34-year operatic career as a composer of over 35 original dramas.

=== Early Viennese period and operas (1770–1778) ===
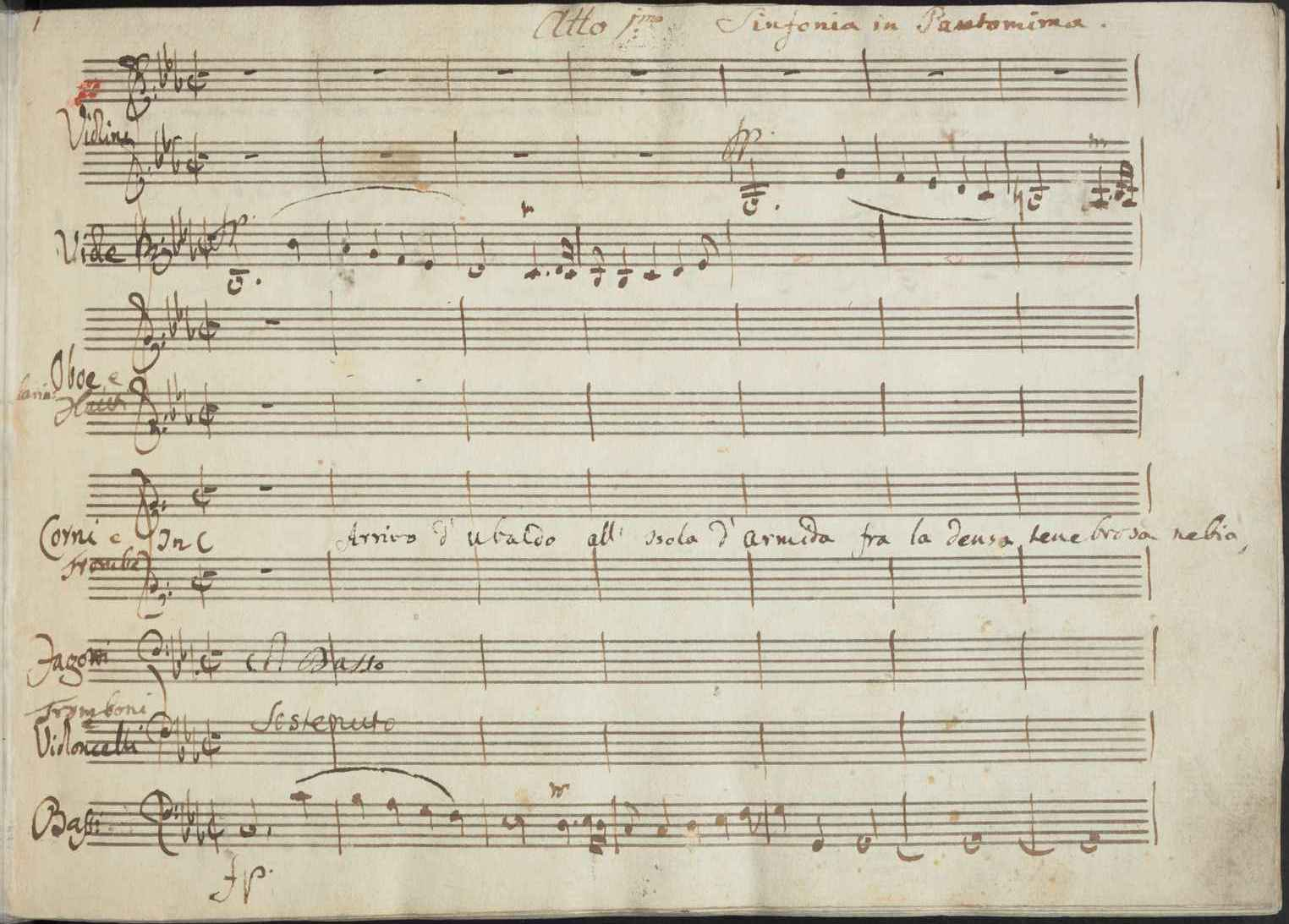
Beginning of the overture to Salieri's Armida in the autograph score

Following the modest success of Le donne letterate, Salieri received new commissions for writing two additional operas in 1770, both with libretti by Giovanni Boccherini. The first, a pastoral opera, L'amore innocente (Innocent Love), was a light-hearted comedy set in the Austrian mountains. The second was based on an episode from Miguel de Cervantes' Don Quixote – Don Chisciotte alle nozze di Gamace (Don Quixote at the Marriage of Camacho). In these first works, drawn mostly from the traditions of mid-century opera buffa, Salieri showed a penchant for experimentation and for mixing the established characteristics of specific operatic genres. Don Chisciotte was a mix of ballet and opera buffa, and the lead female roles in L'amore innocente were designed to contrast and highlight the different traditions of operatic writing for soprano, even borrowing stylistic flourishes from opera seria in the use of coloratura in what was a short pastoral comedy more in keeping with a Roman Intermezzo. The mixing and pushing against the boundaries of established operatic genres was a continuing hallmark of Salieri's own personal style, and in his choice of material for the plot (as in his first opera), he manifested a lifelong interest in subjects drawn from classic drama and literature.

Salieri's first great success was in the realm of serious opera. Commissioned for an unknown occasion, Salieri's Armida was based on Torquato Tasso's epic poem La Gerusalemme liberata (Jerusalem Delivered); it premiered on 2 June 1771. Armida is a tale of love and duty in conflict and is saturated in magic. The opera is set during the First Crusade and features a dramatic mix of ballet, aria, ensemble, and choral writing, combining theatricality, scenic splendor, and high emotionalism. The work clearly followed in Gluck's footsteps and embraced his reform of serious opera beginning with Orfeo ed Euridice and Alceste. The libretto to Armida was by Marco Coltellini, the house poet for the imperial theaters. While Salieri followed the precepts set forth by Gluck and his librettist Ranieri de' Calzabigi in the preface to Alceste, Salieri also drew on some musical ideas from the more traditional opera seria and even opera buffa, creating a new synthesis in the process. Armida was translated into German and widely performed, especially in the northern German states, where it helped to establish Salieri's reputation as an important and innovative modern composer. It was also the first opera to receive a serious preparation in a piano and vocal reduction by Carl Friedrich Cramer in 1783.

Armida was soon followed by Salieri's first truly popular success, a commedia per musica in the style of Carlo Goldoni called La Fiera di Venezia (The Fair of Venice). La Fiera was written for Carnival in 1772 and premiered on 29 January. Here Salieri returned to his collaboration with the young Giovanni Boccherini, who crafted an original plot. La Fiera featured characters singing in three languages, a bustling portrayal of the Ascension-tide Fair and Carnival in Venice, and large and lengthy ensembles and choruses. It also included an innovative scene that combined a series of on-stage dances with singing from both solo protagonists and the chorus. This was a pattern imitated by later composers, most famously and successfully by Wolfgang Amadeus Mozart in Don Giovanni. Salieri also wrote several bravura arias for a soprano playing the part of a middle-class character that combined coloratura and concertante woodwind solos, another innovation for comic opera that was widely imitated.

Salieri's next two operas were not particular or lasting successes. La secchia rapita (The Stolen Bucket) is a parody of the high flown and emotive arias found in Metastasian opera seria. It also contains innovative orchestrations, including the first known use of three tympani. Again a classic of Renaissance literature was the basis of the libretto by Boccherini, in this case, a comic mock-epic by Tassoni, in which a war between Modena and Bologna follows the theft of a bucket. This uneven work was followed by a popular comedic success La locandiera (The Mistress of the Inn), an adaptation of the classic and popular spoken stage comedy La locandiera by Carlo Goldoni, with the libretto prepared by Domenico Poggi.

The majority of Salieri's modest number of instrumental works also date from this time. Salieri's instrumental works have been judged by various critics and scholars to lack the inspiration and innovation found in his writing for the stage. These orchestral works are mainly in the Galant style, and although they show some development toward the late classical, they reflect a general weakness in comparison to his operatic works of the same and later periods. These works were written for mostly unknown occasions and artists. They include two concertos for pianoforte, one in C major and one in B flat major (both 1773); a concerto for organ in C Major in two movements (the middle movement is missing from the autograph score, or perhaps, it was an improvised organ solo) (also 1773); and two concertante works: a concerto for oboe, violin and cello in D major (1770), and a flute and oboe concerto in C major (1774). These works are among the most frequently recorded of Salieri's compositions.

Upon Gassmann's death on 21 January, most likely due to complications from an accident with a carriage some years earlier, Salieri succeeded him as assistant director of the Italian opera in early 1774. On 10 October 1774 Salieri married Therese Helferstorfer, the daughter of a recently deceased financier and official of the court treasury. Sacred music was not a high priority for the composer during this stage of his career, but he did compose an Alleluia for chorus and orchestra in 1774.

During the next three years, Salieri was primarily concerned with rehearsing and conducting the Italian opera company in Vienna and with teaching. His three complete operas written during this time show the development of his compositional skills, but included no great success, either commercially or artistically. His most important compositions during this period were a symphony in D major, performed in the summer of 1776, and the oratorio La Passione di Gesù Cristo with a text by Metastasio, performed during Advent of 1776.

After the financial collapse of the Italian opera company in 1777 due to financial mismanagement, Joseph II decided to end the performance of Italian opera, French-spoken drama, and ballet. Instead, the two court-owned theaters would be reopened under new management, and partly subsidized by the Imperial Court, as a new National Theater. The re-launched theaters would promote German-language plays and musical productions that reflected Austrian (or as Joseph II would have said) German values, traditions, and outlook. The Italian opera buffa company was therefore replaced by a German-language Singspiel troupe. Joseph and his supporters of Imperial reform wanted to encourage pan-national pride that would unite his multi-lingual and ethnic subjects under one common language and hoped to save a considerable amount of money in the process.

Beginning in 1778, the Emperor wished to have new works, in German, composed by his own subjects and brought on the stage with clear Imperial support. This in effect left Salieri's role as assistant court composer in a much-reduced position. Salieri also had never truly mastered the German language, and he now felt no longer competent to continue as an assistant opera director. A further blow to his career was when the spoken drama and musical Singspiel were placed on an equal footing. For the young composer, there would be few, if any, new compositional commissions to receive from the court. Salieri was left with few financial options and he began casting about for new opportunities.

=== Italian tour (1778–1780) ===
In 1778, Gluck turned down an offer to compose the inaugural opera for La Scala in Milan. Upon the suggestion of Joseph II and with the approval of Gluck, Salieri was offered the commission, which he gratefully accepted. Joseph II granted Salieri permission to take a year-long leave of absence (later extended), enabling him to write for La Scala and to undertake a tour of Italy. Salieri's Italian tour of 1778–80 began with the production of Europa riconosciuta (Europa Recognized) for La Scala (revived in 2004 for the same opera house's re-opening following extensive renovations). From Milan, Salieri included stops in Venice and Rome before returning to Milan. During this tour, he wrote three new comic operas and he collaborated with Giacomo Rust on one opera, Il talismano (The Talisman). Of his Italian works one, La Scuola de' gelosi (The School for Jealousy), a witty study of amorous intrigue and emotion, proved a popular and lasting international success.

=== Middle Viennese period and Parisian operas (1780–1788) ===
Upon his return at imperial behest to Vienna in 1780, Salieri wrote one German Singspiel, Der Rauchfangkehrer (The Chimney Sweep), which premiered in 1781. Salieri's Chimney Sweep and Mozart's work for the same company in 1782, Die Entführung aus dem Serail (The Abduction from the Seraglio), were the only two major successes to emerge from the German Singspiel experiment, and only Mozart's opera survived on the stage beyond the close of the 18th century. In 1783 the Italian opera company was revived with singers partly chosen and vetted by Salieri during his Italian tour; the new season opened with a slightly re-worked version of Salieri's recent success La Scuola de' gelosi. Salieri then returned to his rounds of rehearsing, composition, and teaching. However, his time at home in Vienna quickly ended when an opportunity to write an opera for Paris arose, again through the patronage of Gluck. Salieri traveled abroad to fulfill an important commission.

The opera Les Danaïdes (The Danaids) is a five-act tragédie lyrique. The plot was based on an ancient Greek legend that had been the basis for the first play in a trilogy by Aeschylus, entitled The Suppliants. The original commission that reached Salieri in 1783–84 was to assist Gluck in finishing a work for Paris that had been all but completed; in reality, Gluck had failed to notate any of the scores for the new opera and gave the entire project over to his young friend. Gluck feared that the Parisian critics would denounce the opera by a young composer known mostly for comic pieces and so the opera was originally billed in the press as being a new work by Gluck with some assistance from Salieri, then shortly before the premiere of the opera the Parisian press reported that the work was to be partly by Gluck and partly by Salieri, and finally, after popular and critical success on stage, the opera was acknowledged in a letter to the public by Gluck as being wholly by the young Salieri.

Les Danaïdes was received with great acclaim and its popularity with audiences and critics alike produced several further requests for new works for Paris audiences by Salieri. Les Danaïdes followed in the tradition of reform that Gluck had begun in the 1760s and that Salieri had emulated in his earlier opera Armida. Salieri's first French opera contained scenes of great solemnity and festivity, but overshadowing it all was darkness and revenge. The opera depicted politically motivated murder, filial duty and love in conflict, tyrannicide, and finally eternal damnation. The opera, with its dark overture, lavish choral writing, many ballet scenes, and electrifying finale depicting a glimpse of hellish torture, kept the opera on the stage in Paris for over forty years. A young Hector Berlioz recorded the deep impression this work made on him in his Mémoires.

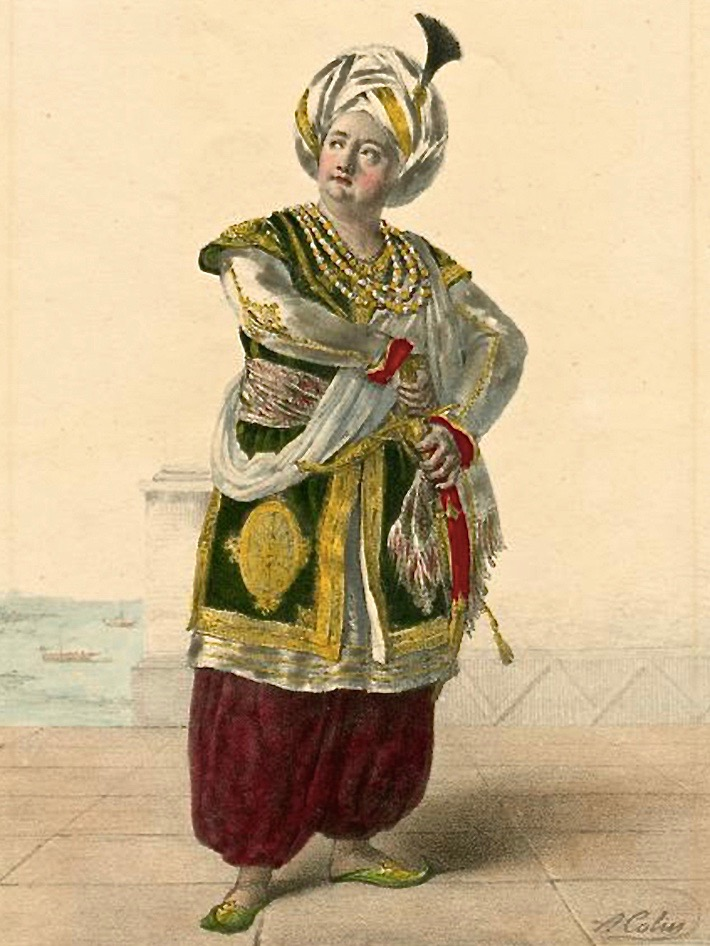
Adolphe Nourrit in the title role in Tarare, in Paris 1823

Upon returning to Vienna following his success in Paris, Salieri met and befriended Lorenzo Da Ponte and had his first professional encounters with Mozart. Da Ponte wrote his first opera libretto for Salieri, Il ricco d'un giorno (A Rich Man for a Day) in 1784, which was not a success. Salieri next turned to Giambattista Casti as a librettist; a more successful set of collaborations flowed from this pairing. In the meantime, Da Ponte began working with Mozart on Le nozze di Figaro (The Marriage of Figaro). In 1785, Salieri produced one of his greatest works with the text by Casti, La grotta di Trofonio (The Cave of Trophonius), the first opera buffa published in full score by Artaria. Shortly after this success, Joseph II had Mozart and Salieri each contribute a one-act opera and/or Singspiel for production at a banquet in 1786. Salieri collaborated with Casti to produce a parody of the relationship between poet and composer in Prima la musica e poi le parole ("First the music and then the words"). This short work also highlighted the typical backstage antics of two high-flown sopranos.

Salieri then returned to Paris for the premiere of his tragédie Lyrique Les Horaces (The Horatii), which proved a failure, which was more than made up for with his next Parisian opera Tarare, with a libretto by Beaumarchais. This was intended to be the nec plus ultra of reform opera, a completely new synthesis of poetry and music that was an 18th-century anticipation of the ideals of Richard Wagner. Salieri also created a sacred cantata Le Judgment dernier (The Last Judgement). The success of his opera Tarare was such that it was soon translated into Italian at Joseph II's behest by Lorenzo Da Ponte as Axur, re d'Ormus (Axur, King of Hormuz) and staged at the royal wedding of Franz II in 1788.

=== Late Viennese operas (1788–1804) ===
In 1788, Salieri returned to Vienna, where he remained for the rest of his life. In that year he became Kapellmeister of the Imperial Chapel upon the death of Giuseppe Bonno; as Kapellmeister he conducted the music and musical school connected with the chapel until shortly before his death, being officially retired from the post in 1824.

His Italian adaptation of Tarare, Axur, proved to be his greatest international success. Axur was widely produced throughout Europe and it even reached South America with the exiled royal house of Portugal in 1824. Axur and his other new compositions completed by 1792 marked the height of Salieri's popularity and his influence. Just as his apogee of fame was being reached abroad, his influence in Vienna began to diminish with the death of Joseph II in 1790. Joseph's death deprived Salieri of his greatest patron and protector.

During this period of imperial change in Vienna and revolutionary ferment in France, Salieri composed two additional extremely innovative musical dramas to libretti by Giovanni Casti. Due, however, to their satiric and overtly liberal political inclinations, both operas were seen as unsuitable for public performance in the politically reactive cultures of Leopold II and later Francis II. This resulted in two of his most original operas being consigned to his desk drawer, namely Cublai, gran kan de' Tartari (Kublai Grand Kahn of Tartary) a satire on the autocracy and court intrigues at the court of the Russian Tsarina, Catherine the Great, and Catilina, a semi-comic/semi-tragic account of the Catiline conspiracy that attempted to overthrow the Roman republic during the consulship of Cicero. These operas were composed in 1787 and 1792 respectively. Two other operas of little success and long-term importance were composed in 1789, and one great popular success La cifra (The Cipher).

As Salieri's political position became insecure he retired as director of the Italian opera in 1792. He continued to write new operas per imperial contract until 1804 when he voluntarily withdrew from the stage. Of his late works for the stage only two works gained wide popular esteem during his life, Palmira, regina di Persia (Palmira, Queen of Persia) (1795) and Cesare in Farmacusa (Caesar on Pharmacusa), both drawing on the heroic and exotic success established with Axur. His late opera based on William Shakespeare's The Merry Wives of Windsor, Falstaff ossia Le tre burle ("Falstaff, or the three tricks", 1799) has found a wider audience in modern times than its original reception promised. His last opera was a German-language Singspiel Die Neger (The Negroes), a melodrama set in colonial Virginia with a text by Georg Friedrich Treitschke (the author of the libretto for Beethoven's Fidelio); it was performed in 1804 and was a complete failure.

=== Life after opera (1804–1825) ===
When Salieri retired from the stage, he recognized that artistic styles had changed and he felt that he no longer had the creative capacity to adapt or the emotional desire to continue. Also as Salieri aged, he moved slowly away from his more liberal political stances as he saw the enlightened reform of Joseph II's reign, and the hoped-for reforms of the French revolution, replaced with more radical revolutionary ideas. As the political situation threatened and eventually overwhelmed Austria, which was repeatedly crushed by French political forces, Salieri's first and most important biographer Ignaz von Mosel described the emotional effect that this political, social, and cultural upheaval had on the composer. Mosel noted that these radical changes, especially the invasion and defeat of Austria, and the occupation of Vienna intertwined with the personal losses that struck Salieri in the same period, led to his withdrawal from operatic work. Related to this Mosel quotes the aged composer concerning the radical changes in musical taste that were underway in the age of Beethoven, "From that period [circa 1800] I realized that musical taste was gradually changing in a manner completely contrary to that of my own times. Eccentricity and confusion of genres replaced reasoned and masterful simplicity."

As his teaching and work with the imperial chapel continued, his duties required the composition of a large number of sacred works, and in his last years, it was almost exclusively in religious works and teaching that Salieri occupied himself. Among his compositions written for the chapel were two complete sets of vespers, many graduals, offertories, and four orchestral masses. During this period he lost his only son in 1805 and his wife in 1807.

Salieri continued to conduct publicly, including the performance on 18 March 1808 of Haydn's The Creation during which Haydn collapsed, and several premieres by Beethoven including the 1st and 2nd Piano Concertos and Wellington's Victory. He also continued to help administer several charities and organize their musical events.

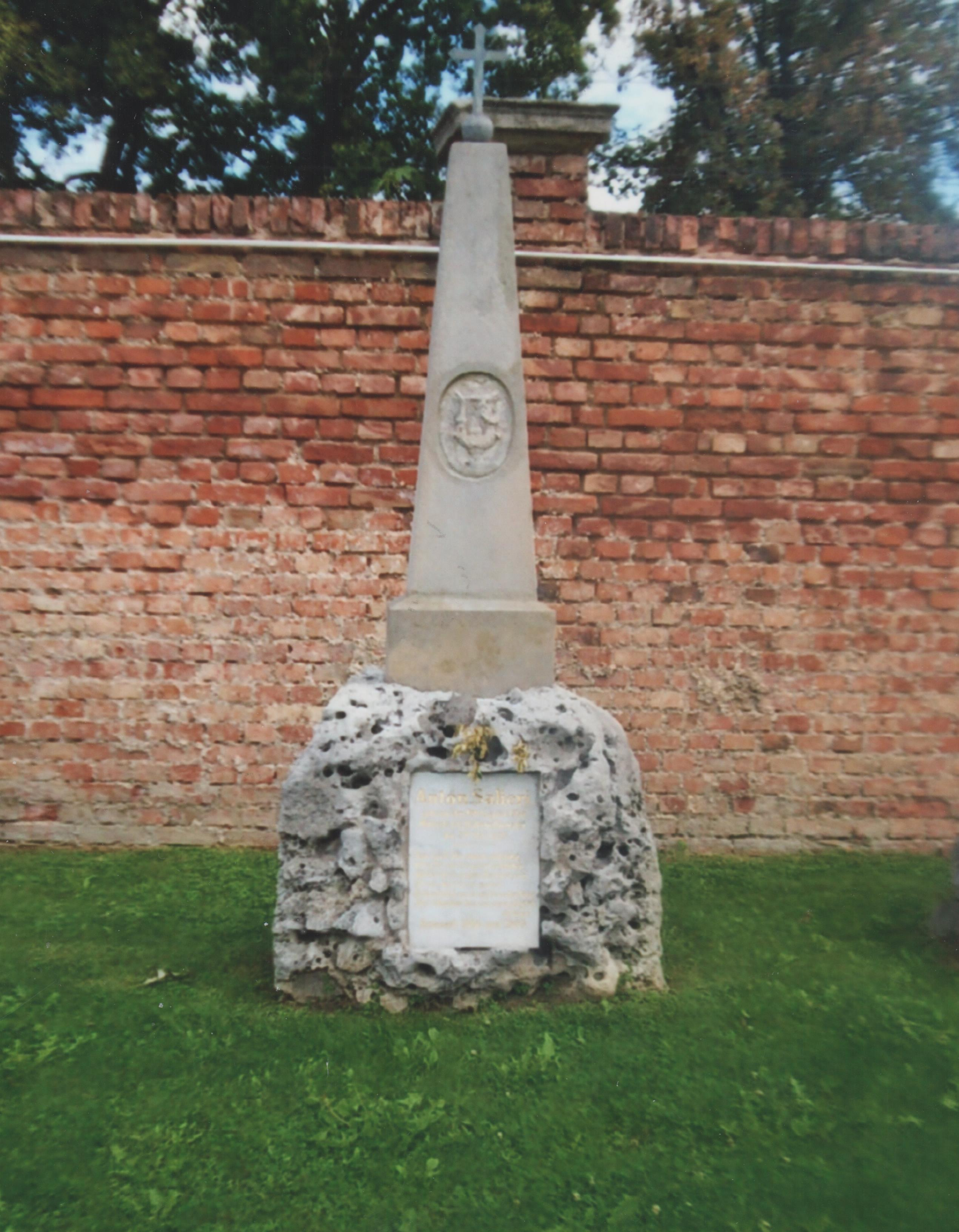
Salieri's grave in Vienna

His remaining secular works in this late period fall into three categories: first, large-scale cantatas and one oratorio Habsburg written on patriotic themes or in response to the international political situation, pedagogical works written to aid his students in voice, and finally simple songs, rounds or canons written for home entertainment; many with original poetry by the composer. He also composed one large-scale instrumental work in 1815 intended as a study in late classical orchestration: Twenty-Six Variations for the Orchestra on a Theme called La Folia di Spagna. The theme is likely folk-derived and is known as La Folía. This simple melodic and harmonic progression had served as an inspiration for many baroque composers and would be used by later romantic and post-romantic composers. Salieri's setting is a brooding work in the minor key, which rarely moves far from the original melodic material, its main interest lies in the deft and varied handling of orchestral colors. La Folia was the most monumental set of orchestral variations before Brahms' Variations on a Theme by Haydn.

His teaching of budding young musicians continued, and among his pupils in composition (usually vocal) were Ludwig van Beethoven, Antonio Casimir Cartellieri, Franz Liszt and Franz Schubert. See: List of music students by teacher: R to S#Antonio Salieri. He also instructed many prominent singers throughout his career, including Caterina Canzi. All but the wealthiest of his pupils received their lessons for free, a tribute to the kindness Gassmann had shown Salieri as a penniless orphan.

In November 1823, Salieri attempted suicide. He was committed to medical care and suffered dementia for the last year and a half of his life. He died in Vienna on 7 May 1825, aged 74 and was buried in the Matzleinsdorfer Friedhof on 10 May. At his memorial service on 22 June 1825, his own Requiem in C minor – composed in 1804 – was performed for the first time. His remains were later transferred to the Zentralfriedhof. His monument is adorned by a poem written by Joseph Weigl, one of his pupils.

== Works ==
=== Opera ===
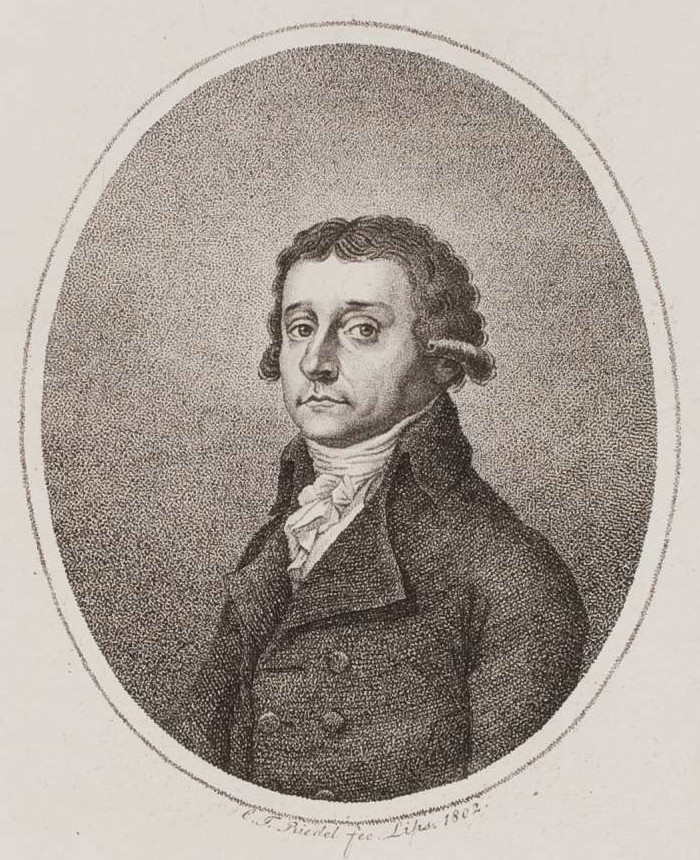
Engraving of Salieri by Carl Traugott Riedel, 1802

During his time in Vienna, Salieri acquired great prestige as a composer and conductor, particularly of opera, but also of chamber and sacred music. Among the most successful of his 37 operas staged during his lifetime were Armida (1771), La fiera di Venezia (1772), La scuola de' gelosi (1778), Der Rauchfangkehrer (1781), Les Danaïdes (1784), which was first presented as a work of Gluck's, La grotta di Trofonio (1785), Tarare (1787) (Tarare was reworked and revised several times as was Les Danaïdes), Axur, re d'Ormus (1788), La cifra (1789), Palmira, regina di Persia (1795), Il mondo alla rovescia (1795), Falstaff (1799), and Cesare in Farmacusa (1800).

=== Sacred works ===
Salieri's earliest surviving work is a Mass in C major. He would write four major orchestral masses, a requiem, and many offertories, graduals, vesper settings, and sacred cantatas and oratorios. Much of his sacred music dates from after his appointment as Hofkapellmeister in 1788.

=== Instrumental works ===
His small instrumental output includes two piano concerti, a concerto for organ written in 1773, a concerto for flute, oboe and orchestra (1774), a triple concerto for oboe, violin and cello, and a set of twenty-six variations on "La follia di Spagna" (1815).

== Relationship with Mozart ==
In the 1780s, while Mozart lived and worked in Vienna, he and his father Leopold wrote in their letters that several "cabals" of Italians led by Salieri were putting obstacles in the way of Mozart's obtaining certain posts or staging his operas. For example, Mozart wrote in December 1781 to his father that "the only one who counts in the Emperor's eyes is Salieri". Their letters suggest that both Mozart and his father, being Austrians who resented the special place that Italian composers had in the courts of the Austrian nobility, blamed the Italians in general and Salieri in particular for Mozart's difficulties in establishing himself in Vienna. Mozart wrote to his father in May 1783 about Salieri and Da Ponte, the court poet: "You know those Italian gentlemen; they are very nice to your face! Enough, we all know about them. And if Da Ponte is in league with Salieri, I'll never get a text from him, and I would love to show him what I can really do with an Italian opera." In July 1783, he again wrote to his father of "a trick of Salieri's", one of several letters in which Mozart accused Salieri of trickery.

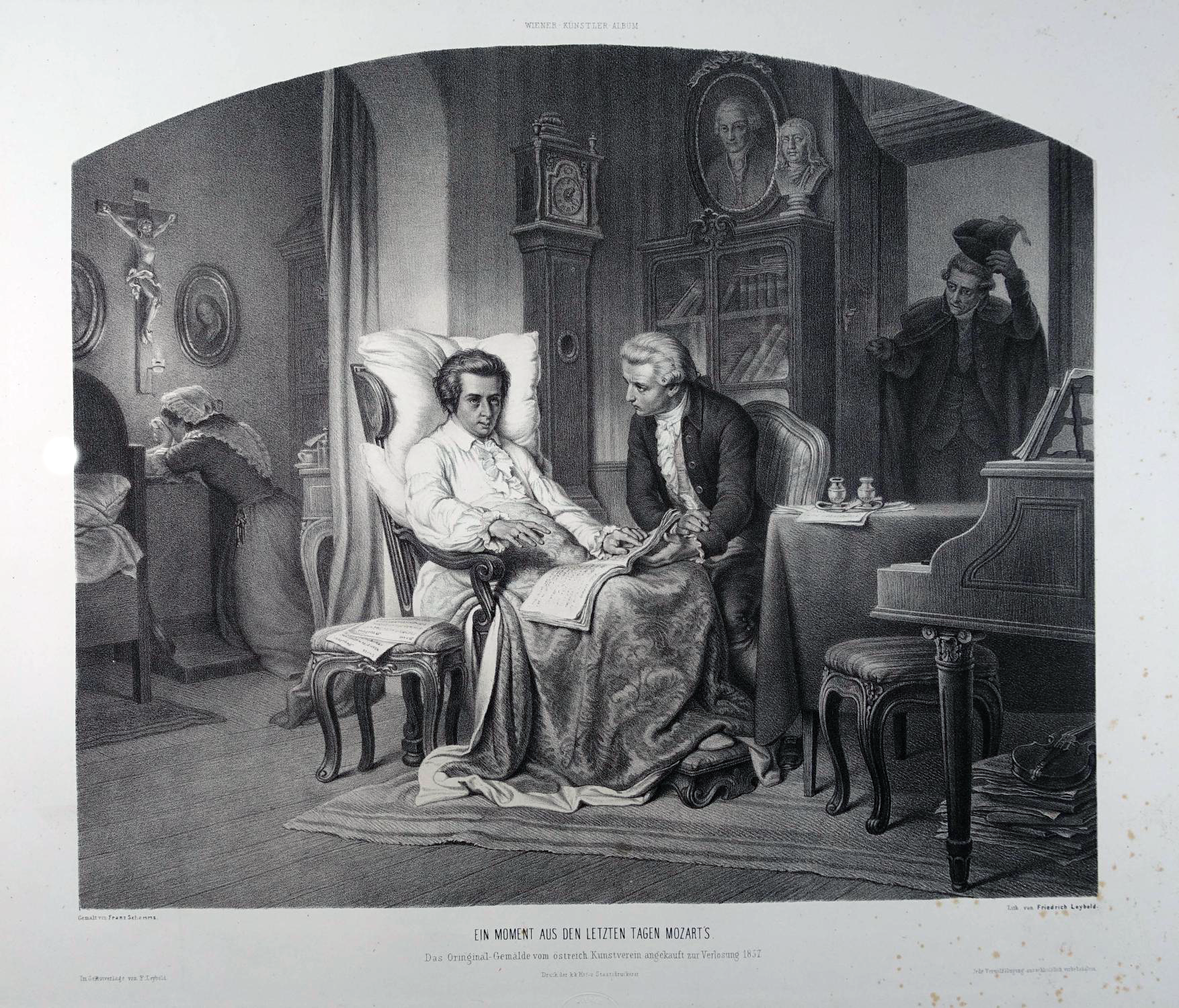
1857 lithograph by Franz Schramm, titled Ein Moment aus den letzten Tagen Mozarts ("Moment from the Last Days of Mozart"). Mozart, with the score of the Requiem on his lap, gives Süssmayr last-minute instructions. Constanze is to the side and the messenger is leaving through the main door.

Decades after Mozart's death, a rumor began to circulate that Mozart had been poisoned by Salieri. This rumor has been attributed by some to a rivalry between the German and the Italian schools of music. Carl Maria von Weber, a relative of Mozart by marriage whom Wagner has characterized as the most German of German composers, is said to have refused to join the Ludlamshöhle (Ludlam's cave), a social club of which Salieri was a member, and avoided having anything to do with him. These rumors then made their way into popular culture. Albert Lortzing's Singspiel Szenen aus Mozarts Leben LoWV28 (1832) and the 1984 film Amadeus uses the cliché of the jealous Salieri trying to hinder Mozart's career.

Salieri's music was much more in the tradition of Gluck and Gassmann than of the Italians like Giovanni Paisiello or Domenico Cimarosa. In 1772, Empress Maria Theresa commented on her preference for Italian composers over Germans like Gassmann, Salieri, or Gluck. While Italian by birth, Salieri had lived in imperial Vienna for almost 60 years and was regarded by such people as the music critic Friedrich Rochlitz as a German composer.

The biographer Alexander Wheelock Thayer believes that Mozart's rivalry with Salieri could have originated with an incident in 1781, when Mozart applied to be the music teacher of Princess Elisabeth of Württemberg, and Salieri was selected instead because of his reputation as a singing teacher. The following year Mozart once again failed to be selected as the princess's piano teacher. "Salieri and his tribe will move heaven and earth to put it down", Leopold Mozart wrote to Wolfgang's sister Nannerl. But at the time of the premiere of Figaro, Salieri was busy with his new French opera Les Horaces. In addition, when Da Ponte was in Prague preparing the production of Mozart's setting of his Don Giovanni, the poet was ordered back to Vienna for a royal wedding at which Salieri's Axur, re d'Ormus would be performed. Mozart was not pleased by this.

The rivalry between Salieri and Mozart became publicly visible as well as audible during the opera composition competition held by Emperor Joseph II in 1786 in the Orangery at Schönbrunn. Mozart was considered the loser of this competition. Mozart's 1791 opera The Magic Flute echoes that competition because the Papageno–Papagena duet is similar to the Cucuzza cavatina in Salieri's Prima la musica e poi le parole. The Magic Flute also echoes Salieri's music in that Papageno's whistle is based on a motif borrowed from Salieri's Concerto for Clavicembalo in B-flat major.

However, there is also evidence attesting to Mozart and Salieri sometimes appearing to support each other's work. For example, when Salieri was appointed Kapellmeister in 1788, he chose to revive Figaro instead of introducing a new opera of his own, and when he attended the coronation festivities for Leopold II in 1790, Salieri had no fewer than three Mozart masses in his luggage. Salieri and Mozart even jointly composed a cantata for voice and piano, Per la ricuperata salute di Ofelia, which celebrated the return to the stage of the singer Nancy Storace. This work, although it had been printed by Artaria in 1785, was considered lost until 10 January 2016, when the Schwäbische Zeitung reported on the discovery by musicologist and composer Timo Jouko Herrmann of a copy of its text and music while doing research on Antonio Salieri in the collections of the Czech Museum of Music. Mozart's Davide penitente (1785), his Piano Concerto KV 482 (1785), the Clarinet Quintet (1789) and the 40th Symphony (1788) had been premiered on the suggestion of Salieri, who supposedly conducted a performance of it in 1791. In his last surviving letter from 14 October 1791, Mozart told his wife that he had picked up Salieri and Caterina Cavalieri in his carriage and driven them both to the opera; about Salieri's attendance at his opera The Magic Flute, speaking enthusiastically: "He heard and saw with all his attention, and from the overture, to the last choir there was not a piece that didn't elicit a 'Bravo!' or 'Bello!' out of him [...]."

Salieri, along with Mozart's protégé Johann Nepomuk Hummel educated Mozart's younger son Franz Xaver Mozart, who was born about four months before his father's death.

== Legacy ==
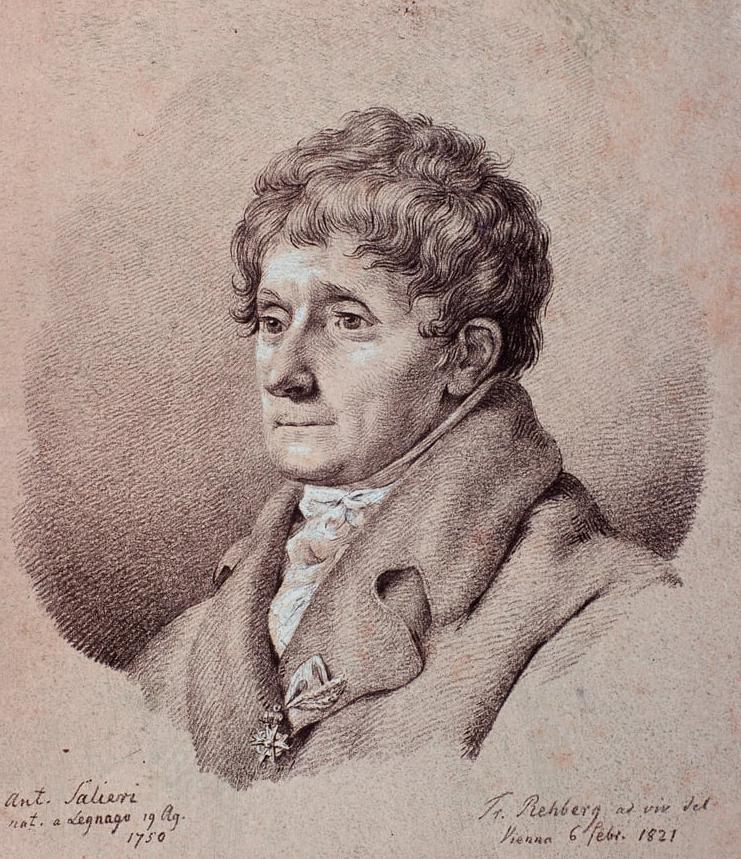
Portrait of Antonio Salieri by F. Reberg, 1821

Salieri and his music were largely forgotten from the 19th century until the late 20th century. This revival was due to the dramatic and highly fictionalized depiction of Salieri in Peter Shaffer's play Amadeus (1979), which was given its greatest exposure in its 1984 film version, directed by Miloš Forman. His music today has regained some modest popularity via recordings. It is also the subject of increasing academic study, and a small number of his operas have returned to the stage. In addition, there is now a Salieri Opera Festival sponsored by the Fondazione Culturale Antonio Salieri and dedicated to rediscovering his work and those of his contemporaries. It is developing as an annual autumn event in his native town of Legnago, where a theatre has been renamed in his honor.

=== Modern performances of Salieri's work ===
In 2003, mezzo-soprano Cecilia Bartoli released The Salieri Album, a CD with 13 arias from Salieri's operas, most of which had never been recorded before. Patrice Michaels sang a number of his arias on the CD Divas of Mozart's Day. In 2008, another female opera star, Diana Damrau, released a CD with seven Salieri coloratura arias. Since 2000, there have also been complete recordings issued or re-issued of the operas Axur Re d'Ormus, Falstaff, Les Danaïdes, La Locandiera, La grotta di Trofonio, Prima la musica e poi le parole and Il mondo alla rovescia. Salieri has yet to fully re-enter the general repertory, but performances of his works are progressively becoming more regular.

His operas Falstaff (1995 production from the Schwetzingen Festival) and Tarare (1987 production, also from the Schwetzingen Festival) have been released on DVD. In 2004, the opera Europa riconosciuta was staged in Milan for the reopening of La Scala in Milan, with soprano Diana Damrau in the title role. This production was also broadcast on television.

In November 2009, Il mondo alla rovescia was given its first staging in modern times at the Teatro Salieri in Legnago in a co-production between the Fondazione Culturale Antonio Salieri and the Fondazione Arena di Verona for the Salieri Opera Festival. From 2009 to 2011 Antonio Giarola directed the Festival. From 2009 to 2012 Antonio Giarola also directed the Varietas Delectat, a contemporary dance show inspired by the music of Antonio Salieri.

On 14 November 2011 in Graz, Austria, the hometown of the librettist Leopold Auenbrugger, Salieri's Der Rauchfangkehrer was given its first modern production. In July 2014 there was another modern production of this Salieri opera. This time it was the Pinchgut Opera of Sydney, Australia, performing it as The Chimneysweep. The Sydney Morning Herald referred to it as the discovery of "a long-forgotten treasure".

=== Use of music by Salieri in films ===
Salieri has even begun to attract some attention from Hollywood. In 2001, his triple concerto was used in the soundtrack of The Last Castle, featuring Robert Redford and James Gandolfini. It is a story that builds on the rivalry between a meticulous but untested officer (Gandolfini) serving as the warden of a military prison and an imprisoned but much admired and highly decorated general (Redford). The Salieri piece is used as the warden's theme music, seemingly to invoke the image of jealousy of the inferior for his superior. In 2006, the movie Copying Beethoven referred to Salieri in a more positive light. In this movie, a young female music student hired by Beethoven to copy out his Ninth Symphony is staying at a monastery. The abbess tries to discourage her from working with the irreverent Beethoven. She notes that she too once had dreams, having come to Vienna to study opera singing with Salieri. The 2008 film Iron Man used the Larghetto movement from Salieri's Piano Concerto in C major. The scene where Obadiah Stane, the archrival of Tony Stark, the wealthy industrialist turned Iron Man, tells Tony that he is being ousted from his company by the board, Obadiah plays the opening few bars of the Salieri concerto on a piano in Stark's suite.

=== Fictional treatments ===
Salieri's life, and especially his relationship with Mozart, has been the subject of many stories, in a variety of media.

- Within a few years of Salieri's death in 1825, Alexander Pushkin wrote his "little tragedy" Mozart and Salieri (1831), as a dramatic study of the sin of envy. This work was the inspiration for Peter Shaffer's 1979 play, Amadeus.
- In 1898, Russian composer Nikolai Rimsky-Korsakov adapted Pushkin's play, Mozart and Salieri (1831), as an opera of the same name.
- A hugely popular yet heavily fictionalized perpetuation of the story came in Peter Shaffer's play Amadeus (1979) and its Oscar-winning 1984 film adaptation directed by Miloš Forman. Salieri was portrayed in the award-winning play at London's National Theatre by Paul Scofield, on Broadway by Ian McKellen, and in the film by F. Murray Abraham (who won the Academy Award for Best Actor for the part). Abraham depicts Salieri as a Machiavellian, Iago-esque character, who uses his connections to keep Mozart as the underdog and slowly destroy Mozart's career.
- Salieri's supposed hatred for Mozart is also alluded to in a spoof opera titled A Little Nightmare Music (1982), by P. D. Q. Bach. In the opera, Salieri attempts to poison an anachronistic Shaffer but is bumped by a "clumsy oaf", which causes him to inadvertently poison Mozart instead and spill wine on his favorite coat.
- Patrick Stewart played Salieri in the 1985 production The Mozart Inquest.
- Florent Mothe portrays Salieri in the French musical Mozart, l'opéra rock (2009).
- C. Ian Kyer's first work of fiction is the historical novel Damaging Winds: Rumours that Salieri Murdered Mozart Swirl in the Vienna of Beethoven and Schubert (2013). Kyer was the co-author, with Bruce Salvatore, of the singspiel Setting the Record Straight: Mozart and Salieri Redux, first performed by the Adler Fellows of the San Francisco Opera Center in April 2016 under the direction of Erin Neff.
- The HBO period drama telemovie, Virtuoso (2015), directed by Alan Ball, is largely centred around the early life of Salieri.
- Amadeus (TV series), a six-part miniseries from Sky UK, features Paul Bettany as Salieri with Will Sharpe as Mozart in an expanded retelling of the Peter Shaffer stage drama

== Notes, references, sources ==
Notes

Cited sources

- Berlioz, Hector (2002). The Memoirs of Hector Berlioz. trans. and ed. David Cairns. New York: Everyman.
- Braunbehrens, Volkmar (1992). Maligned Master – The Real Story of Antonio Salieri. Translated by Eveline L. Kanes. New York: Fromm International Publishing Corporation.
- Schatkin Hettrick, Jane; Rice, John A. (2001). "Salieri, Antonio". Grove Music Online. Oxford: Oxford University Press. doi:10.1093/gmo/9781561592630.article.24378. ISBN 978-1-56159-263-0. (subscription, Wikilibrary access, or UK public library membership required)
- Lorenz, Michael (2013). "Antonio Salieri's Early Years in Vienna".
- Rice, John A. (1998). Antonio Salieri and Viennese Opera. Chicago: University of Chicago Press. ISBN 978-0-226-71125-6.
- Sadie, Stanley, ed. (1988). "Mozart". The New Grove Dictionary of Music and Musicians. London: Macmillan. ISBN 978-0-333-23111-1. OCLC 611992375.
- Solomon, Maynard (1995). Mozart: A Life (1st ed.). New York City: HarperCollins. ISBN 978-0-06-019046-0. OCLC 31435799.
- Spaethling, Robert (2000). Mozart's Letters, Mozart's Life. New York: W. W. Norton. ISBN 9780393047196.
- Thayer, Alexander Wheelock (1989). Theodore Albrecht (ed.). Salieri: Rival of Mozart. The Philharmonia of Greater Kansas City. ISBN 978-0-932845-37-5.
