= Il ricco d'un giorno =

Opera by Antonio Salieri

- Dramma giocoso by Antonio Salieri
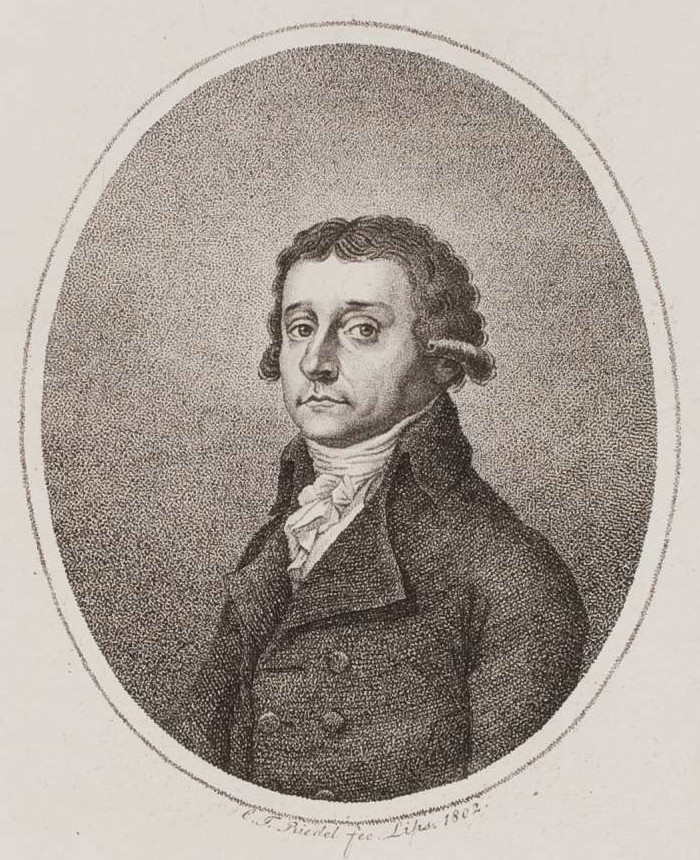
- Antonio Salieri, engraving by Carl Traugott Riedel, 1802
- Librettist: Lorenzo Da Ponte
- Language: Italian
- Based on: work by Giovanni Bertati
- Premiere: 6 December 1784; Burgtheater, Vienna

Il ricco d'un giorno is a dramma giocoso in three acts composed by Antonio Salieri. The Italian libretto was by Lorenzo Da Ponte after a work by Giovanni Bertati.

== Performance history ==
The opera was first given on 6 December 1784 at the Burgtheater in Vienna.

== Roles ==
Cast	Voice type	Premiere, 6 December 1784 (Conductor: - )
Emilia	soprano	
Giacinto	tenor	
Strettonio	bass	
Doralice	soprano	
Mascherone	bass	
Berto	bass	
Lauretta	soprano	
