= Don Chisciotte alle nozze di Gamace =

Opera by Antonio Salieri

- Opera by Antonio Salieri
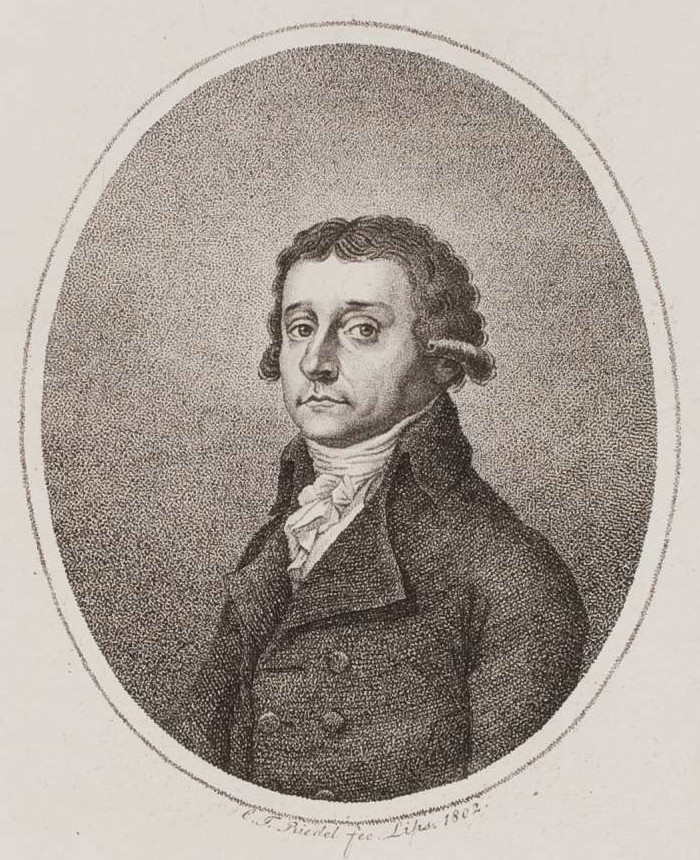
- Antonio Salieri, engraving by Carl Traugott Riedel, 1802
- Translation: Don Quixote at Camacho's Wedding
- Librettist: Giovanni Gastone Boccherini
- Language: Italian
- Based on: Don Quixote by Cervantes
- Premiere: 1771; Kärntnertortheater, Vienna

Don Chisciotte alle nozze di Gamace (Don Quixote at Camacho's Wedding), composed by Antonio Salieri, is an Italian-language opera. The libretto presents the opera as in one act (five scenes), and the musical score includes a mid-point division, both score, and libretto originally denoted the work a divertimento treatrale. The libretto was written by Giovanni Gastone Boccherini, dancer, poet and stage manager, brother of the composer Luigi Boccherini. The work is loosely adapted from chapters 19 and 21 of Part II of the novel Don Quixote by Miguel de Cervantes. The work was a hybrid opera buffa and ballet, with choreography by Jean-Georges Noverre.

This opera was the third of Salieri's to be publicly performed, as well as his third collaboration with Boccherini. This was Salieri's fourth complete opera.

== Performance history ==
Salieri, wrote Don Chisciotte in Vienna in 1770, according to his first biographer Mosel it may have been the second or third work he wrote with Boccherini. It received its first performance during Carnival season the next year at the Kärntnertortheater in Vienna, the libretto is dated 1770, but it was most likely on performed on 6 January 1771. It is believed the work was not revived until 8 October 2016 at the Festival Internacional Cervantino de Guanajuato México where it was performed in a concert performance by Les Nouveaux Caractères under the direction of Sébastien d'Hérin.

== Roles ==
Role	Voice type	Premiere cast, Carnival, 1770 or 1771 (Conductor: Antonio Salieri (most likely))
Gamace, peasant, Bridegroom of Chitteria	tenor	Francesco Bussani
Chitteria, bride of Gamace	mezzo-soprano	Teresa Eberardi
Don Chisciotte, wandering knight	bass	Vincenzo Schiettini
Sancio Pancia, his squire	tenor	Antonio Boscoli
Menco, peasant	tenor	Kurzin
Lena, peasant in love with Menco	soprano	Gabriella Tagliafferi
Il Cavalier del Bosco, knight	tenor	Rizzoli
Nasone, his squire	bass	Santini
Rosa, a peasant's wife	soprano	Clementina Chiavacci
Gnocco, head of the cooks	tenor	Deville
Alfeo, a male peasant who dances	non-singing role	
Giocondina, a female peasant who dances	non-singing role	
Chorus of peasants (male and female) and cooks; Ballet of peasants

== Synopsis ==
Time: the 17th century
Place: rural Spain, the wedding near the farmhouse of Gamace.

Summary: Don Quoxite and Sancho Panza arrive at the wedding of Comacho (Gamace) and participate in dances and verbal intrigues as the wedding feast is prepared.

== Structure, genre, critical reception ==
The work combines dances, dance suites for ballet with arias, short songs, recitatives, and ensembles in an attempt to create a new artistic hybrid between Goldonian opera buffa and French ballet. The work was scored for strings, pairs of oboes, bassoons, and horns. The orchestration was likely dictated by the post-performance needs for dancing at the theater's carnival ball.

The work did not please and was apparently never revived in Vienna or elsewhere in Salieri's lifetime.

Salieri reused the opening theme of the overture later in 1795 for his revision and completion of the opera Il mondo alla rovescia where it also serves as the main theme of the overture.

== Recordings ==
There is no known studio recording of the complete opera; however, Antonio Salieri: Overtures, (Slovak Radio Symphony Orchestra (Bratislava), conducted by Michael Dittrich, Naxos 8.554838) has a recording of the overture.
