= Volkmar Braunbehrens =

German musicologist and publisher

Volkmar von Braunbehrens (born 22 March 1941 in Freiburg im Breisgau) is a German musicologist, specialising in research about Wolfgang Amadeus Mozart.

Braunbehrens studied history of literature, musicology, and art history in Munich, Heidelberg and Berlin; he received his PhD from the Free University of Berlin in 1974. He is Privatdozent (associate professor) since 1981. In 1976, he co-founded, and until 1981 co-edited, the journal Berliner Hefte – Zeitschrift für Kultur und Politik; for many years, he was director of an art gallery in Berlin.

From 1967 to 1971 Braunbehrens was a board member of the Humanist Union. He lives as a freelance author in Freiburg. His brother, Adrian Braunbehrens, is a writer and philologist.

== Publications ==
- Kunst der bürgerlichen Revolution von 1830 bis 1848/49, exhibition catalogue, Berlin 1972
- Nationalbildung und Nationalliteratur: Zur Rezeption der Literatur des 17. Jahrhunderts von Gottsched bis Gervinus (PhD thesis 1972), Berlin 1974. ISBN 3920889231
- Mozart in Vienna, 1781–1791 New York: Grove Weidenfeld, 1990. ISBN 0-8021-1009-6 (translated by Timothy Bell, original title: Mozart in Wien, Munich 1986)
- Mozart – Lebensbilder (with Karl-Heinz Jürgens)
- Maligned master: the real story of Antonio Salieri (Aldershot: Scolar Press, 1992) ISBN 0859679748. Translated from the German by Eveline L. Kanes, originally published in 1989 as Salieri. Ein Musiker im Schatten Mozarts? – Eine Biografie, Munich-Zurich 1989. ISBN 3-492-18322-0.
