= Palmira, regina di Persia =

Opera by Antonio Salieri

- Opera by Antonio Salieri
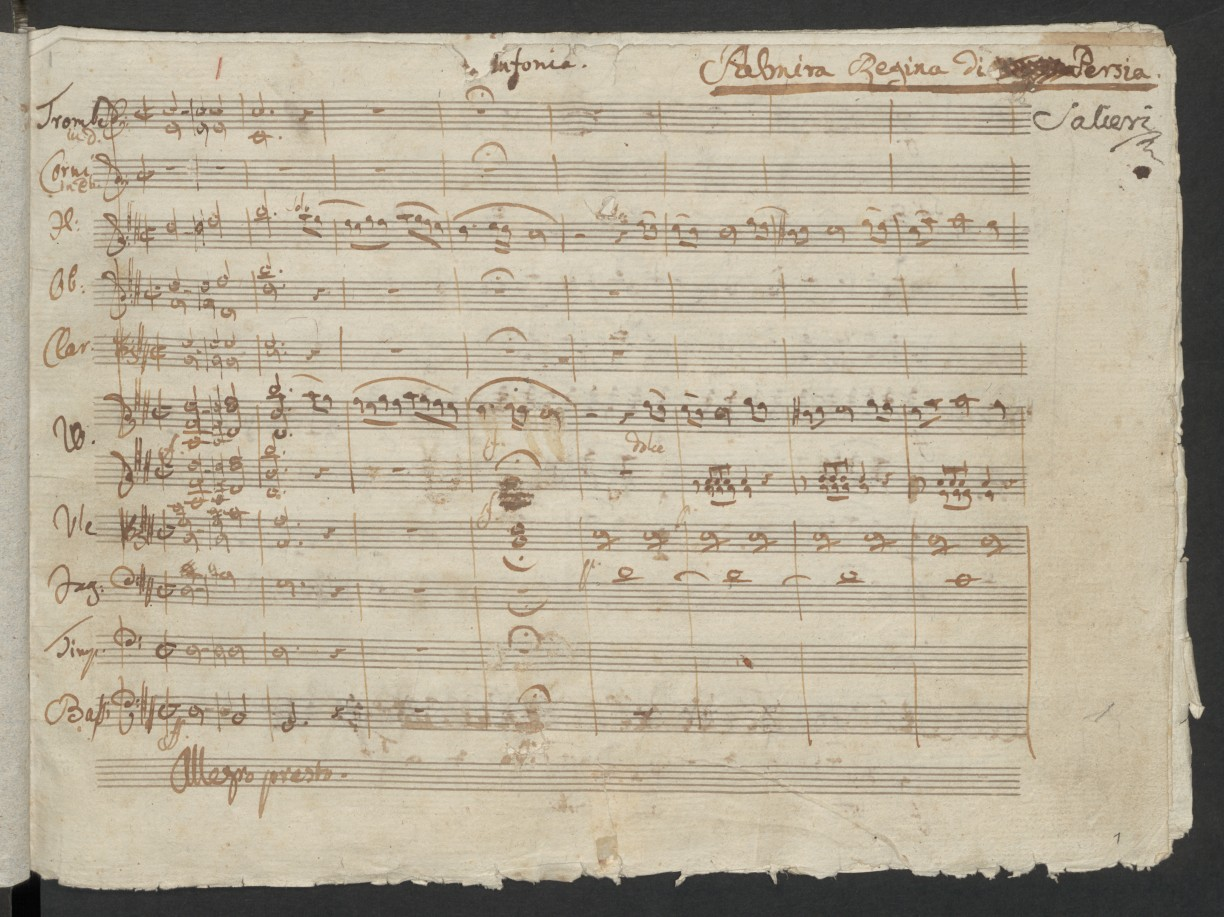
- Beginning of the manuscript
- Librettist: Giovanni de Gamerra
- Language: Italian
- Premiere: 14 October 1795; Kärntnertortheater, Vienna

Palmira, regina di Persia is an opera by Antonio Salieri: more specifically, it is a dramma eroicomico. The opera is in two acts and is set to a libretto by Giovanni de Gamerra.

Salieri mingled elements of comic opera and heroic opera to produce a work that was a popular success at the time of its first performance, also partly due to the grandiose staging that is called for.

== Performance history ==
The opera was first performed at the Kärntnertortheater in Vienna on 14 October 1795, and staged 39 times in the Austrian capital between then and 1798. It was also given in Germany in translation.

== Roles ==
Roles	Voice type	Premiere, October 14, 1795 (Conductor: - )	First Cast
High Priest	bass		
Palmira, Princess of Persia	soprano		
Alderano, King of Egypt	bass		
Oronte, King of Scythia	bass		
Alcidoro, King of India	tenor		
Darius the Great, King of Persia	bass		

== Synopsis ==
Set in ancient Persia, three Kings, arriving variously on a camel, an elephant and a horse, vie for the honour of killing a monster and winning the hand of the Persian princess Palmira.
