= La cifra =

Opera by Antonio Salieri

- Dramma giocoso by Antonio Salieri
- Title page of the libretto
- Librettist: Lorenzo Da Ponte
- Language: Italian
- Premiere: 11 December 1789; Vienna

La cifra is an opera by Antonio Salieri in two acts, set to an Italian libretto by Lorenzo Da Ponte.

The work, a dramma giocoso, is set in Scotland, and was written for Adriana Ferrarese del Bene, the first Fiordiligi in Mozart's Così fan tutte.

== Performance history ==
The opera was first performed in Vienna on 11 December 1789. This was followed by a production in Dresden on 13 October 1790. It went on to receive several productions both in Germany and Austria between 1789 and 1805.

La cifra received a recent performance in Cologne in June 2006, in a production conducted by Martin Haselböck and directed by Christian Stückl. In August 2018, Dell’Arte Opera Ensemble performed La Cifra at La Mama as part of that summer's Mozart and Salieri Festival. It was the opera's North American premiere, conducted by Catherine O'Shaughnessy and directed by Bea Goodwin

== Roles ==
There are two cast lists written in different handwriting for the 1789 premiere of La cifra, one written at the end of the overture, and one written at the end of Salieri's commentary on his score. Both lists include a character, Gualtiere, who does not appear in the opera and a performer, Paolo Mandini, who was no longer with the company. Contemporary newspaper accounts list different performers in some of the roles.

Cast	Voice type	Cast list at end of overture	Cast listed at end of score	Cast per newspaper accounts
Eurilla	soprano	Adriana Ferrarese del Bene	Adriana Ferrarese del Bene	Adriana Ferrarese del Bene
Lisotta, the daughter of Rusticone	soprano	Bettina Colombati	Bettina Colombati	Dorothea Bussani
Rusticone, mayor and hotel owner	bass	Francesco Benucci	Francesco Benucci	Francesco Benucci
Milord Fideling	tenor	Francesco Bussani	Francesco Bussani	Vincenzo Calvesi
Leandro, friend of Milord Fideling	tenor	Girolamo Cruciati	Nicolò Del Sole	
Sandrino, the future groom of Lisotta	bass	Paolo Mandini	Girolamo Cruciati	
Gualtiere (character not in the opera)		Nicolò Del Sole	Paolo Mandini	

== Synopsis ==
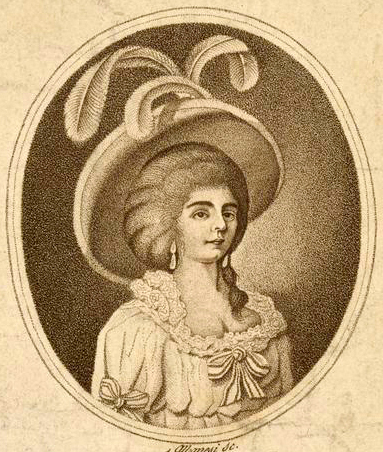
Adriana Ferrarese del Bene who created the role of Eurilla in La cifra

Fideling, a Scottish lord, is seeking a lost noblewoman with whom he had fallen in love. Lisotta, the daughter of the town's mayor, is betrothed to Sandrino, but is in love with Fideling and believes herself to be the woman he is searching for. Eurilla also loves Fideling but despairs because she is a mere shepherdess. In Act II, before her true identity is revealed, she sings 'Alfin son sola ... Sola e mesta' (In the end I am alone... Alone and sad). It finally emerges that Eurilla is in fact the daughter of a nobleman. She and Fideling are reunited and all ends happily in the finale.

== Recordings ==
There is no known studio recording of the complete opera, However, The Salieri Album, (Cecilia Bartoli with the Orchestra of the Age of Enlightenment, conducted by Ádám Fischer, Decca 475 100–2) has two excerpts:

- 'E voi da buon marito ... Non vo’ gia che vi suonino' (Lisotta's recitative and aria from Act I)
- 'Alfin son sola ... Sola e mesta fra tormenti' (Eurilla's recitative and rondo from Act II)
