= Carl Traugott Riedel =

German engraver and printmaker (1769–1832)

- Born: Carl Traugott Riedel; 1769; Lubań, Electorate of Saxony, Holy Roman Empire
- Died: 1832 (aged 62–63)
- Other name: C.T. Riedel
- Occupation: Engraver
- Known for: Engraving; Printmaking

Carl Traugott Riedel (1769 – 1832) was a German engraver and printmaker.

== Early life ==
Carl (or Karl) Traugott Riedel was born in Lubań (then part of the Electorate of Saxony, now in Poland) in 1769.

== Career ==
He worked primarily as an engraver in his hometown of Lubań and in Leipzig. During the 1800s, he engraved title vignettes for several editions published by Breitkopf & Härtel in Leipzig.

Many engraved portraits by Riedel are preserved, featuring musical personalities such as Antonio Salieri, Peter Hänsel, Johann Georg Albrechtsberger, Luigi Cherubini, Pierre Rode, Beethoven, Rodolphe Kreutzer, and Joseph Gelinek.

In 1801, Riedel was commissioned by Hoffmeister & Kühnel's Bureau de Musique (now Edition Peters) to paint Beethoven's portrait after the Vienna showing of Johann Joseph Neidl's work. Riedel's engraving of Italian composer Antonio Salieri was completed in 1802. In 1804, he made another stipple engraving for Hoffmeister & Kühnel of Czech composer Jan Ladislav Dussek. The sheet is preserved in both the Leipzig University Library and the British Museum of London.

Riedel completed a portrait engraving of German pianist Daniel Steibelt around 1809. In 1810, he was commissioned by Breitkopf & Härtel to engrave a portrait of Austrian composer Carl Ditters von Dittersdorf.

== Death ==
Carl Traugott Riedel died in 1832.

== Gallery ==
Works by Carl Traugott Riedel

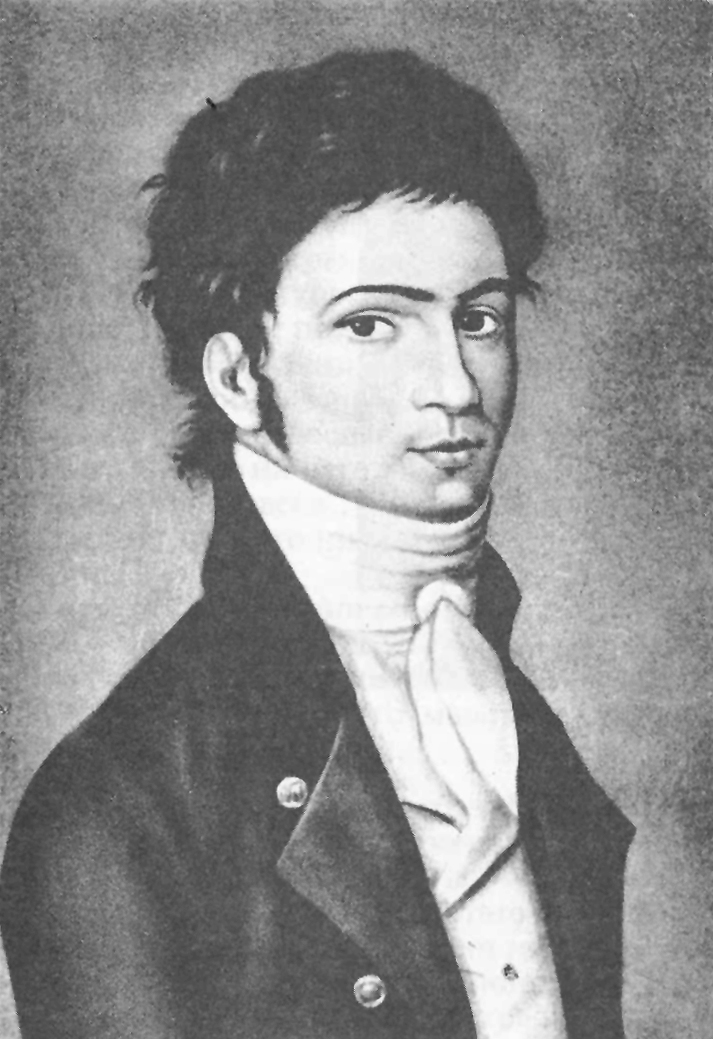
Beethoven

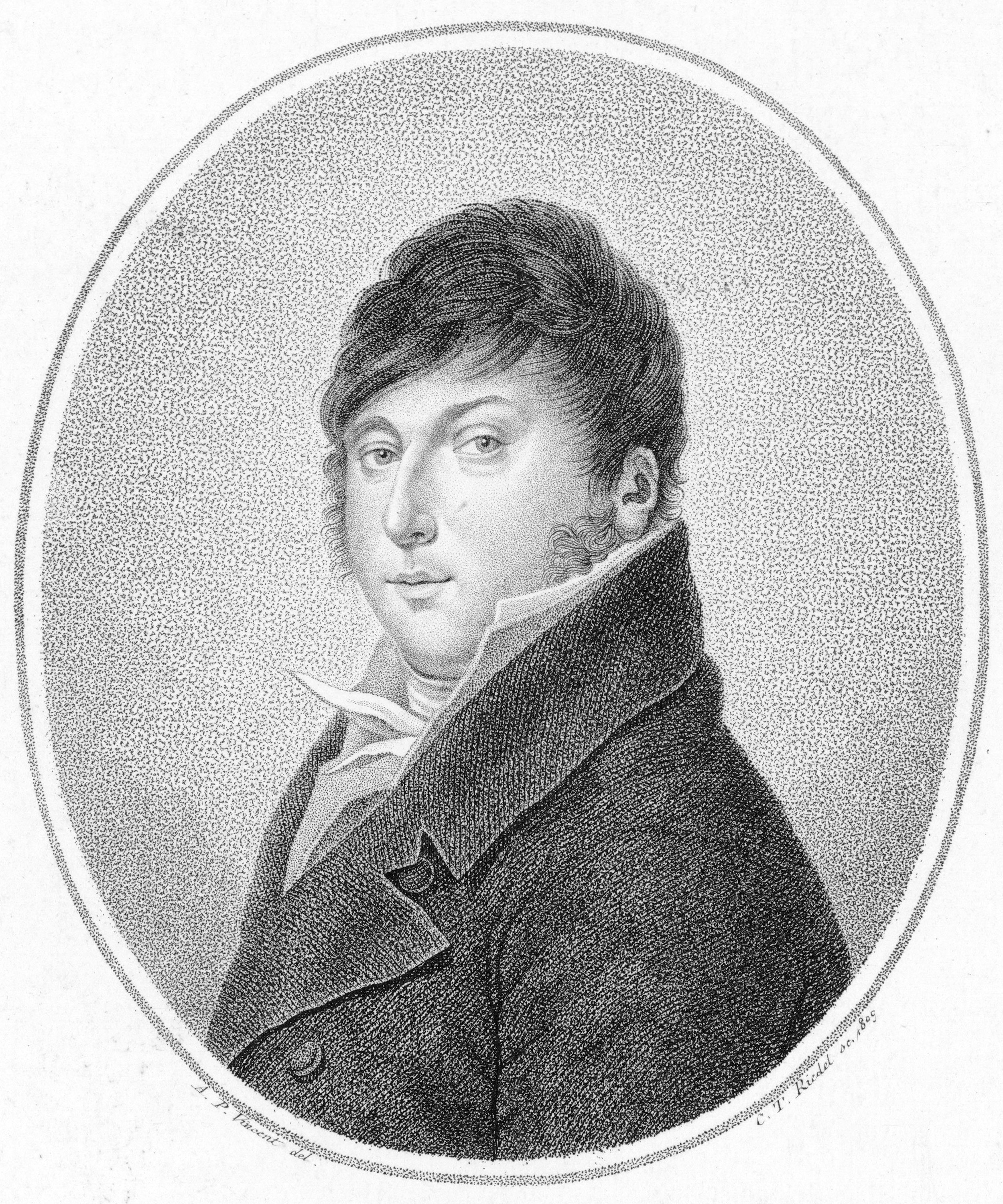
Rodolphe Kreutzer

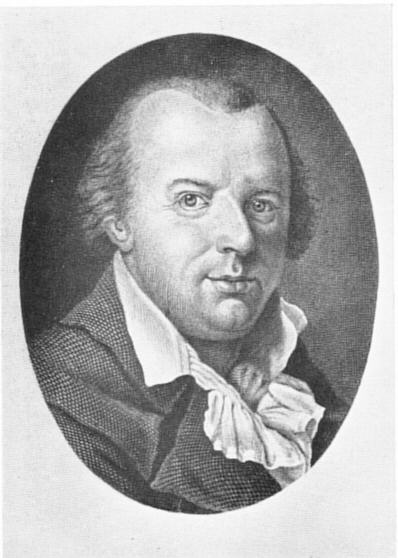
Johann Friedrich Reichardt

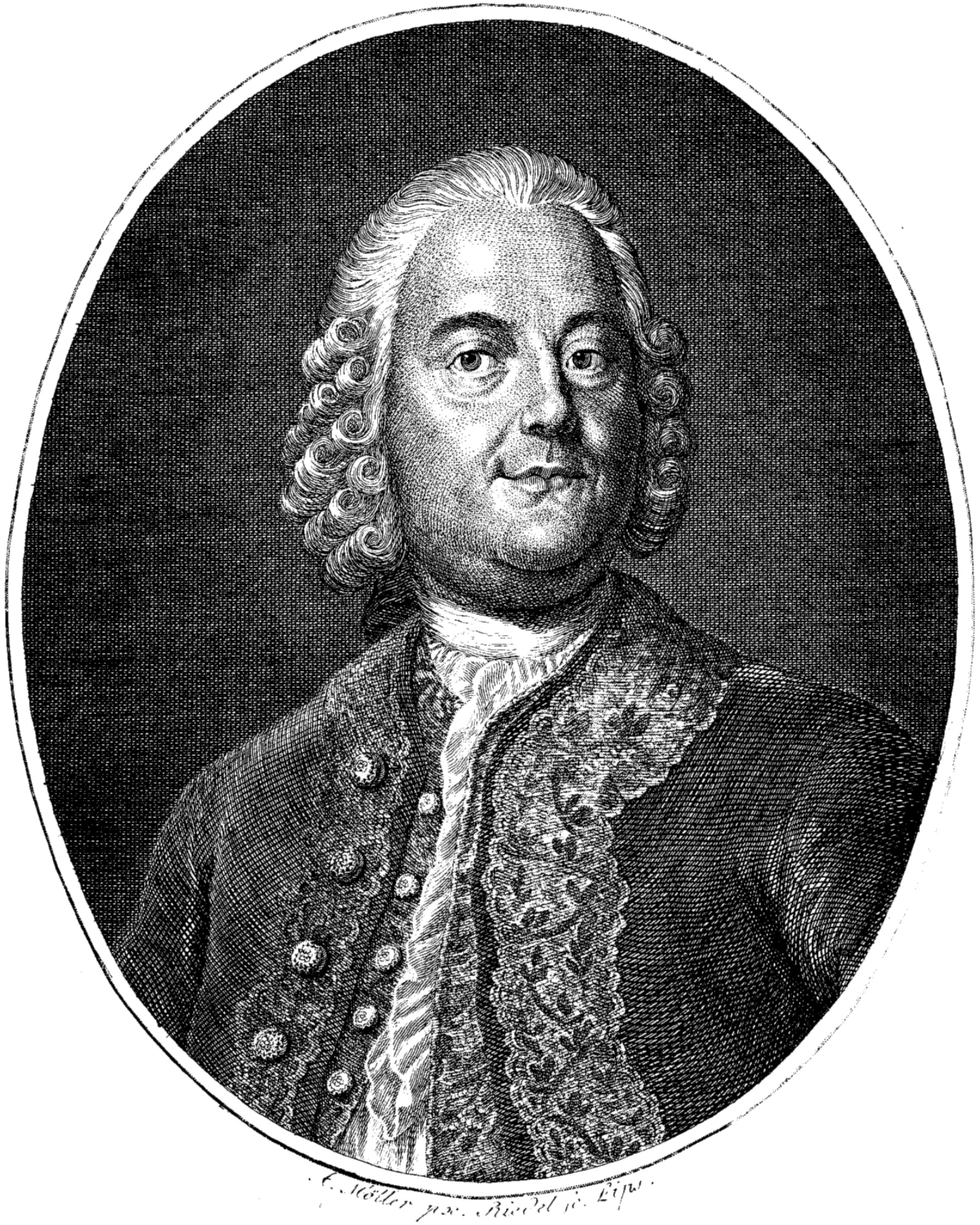
Carl Heinrich Graun

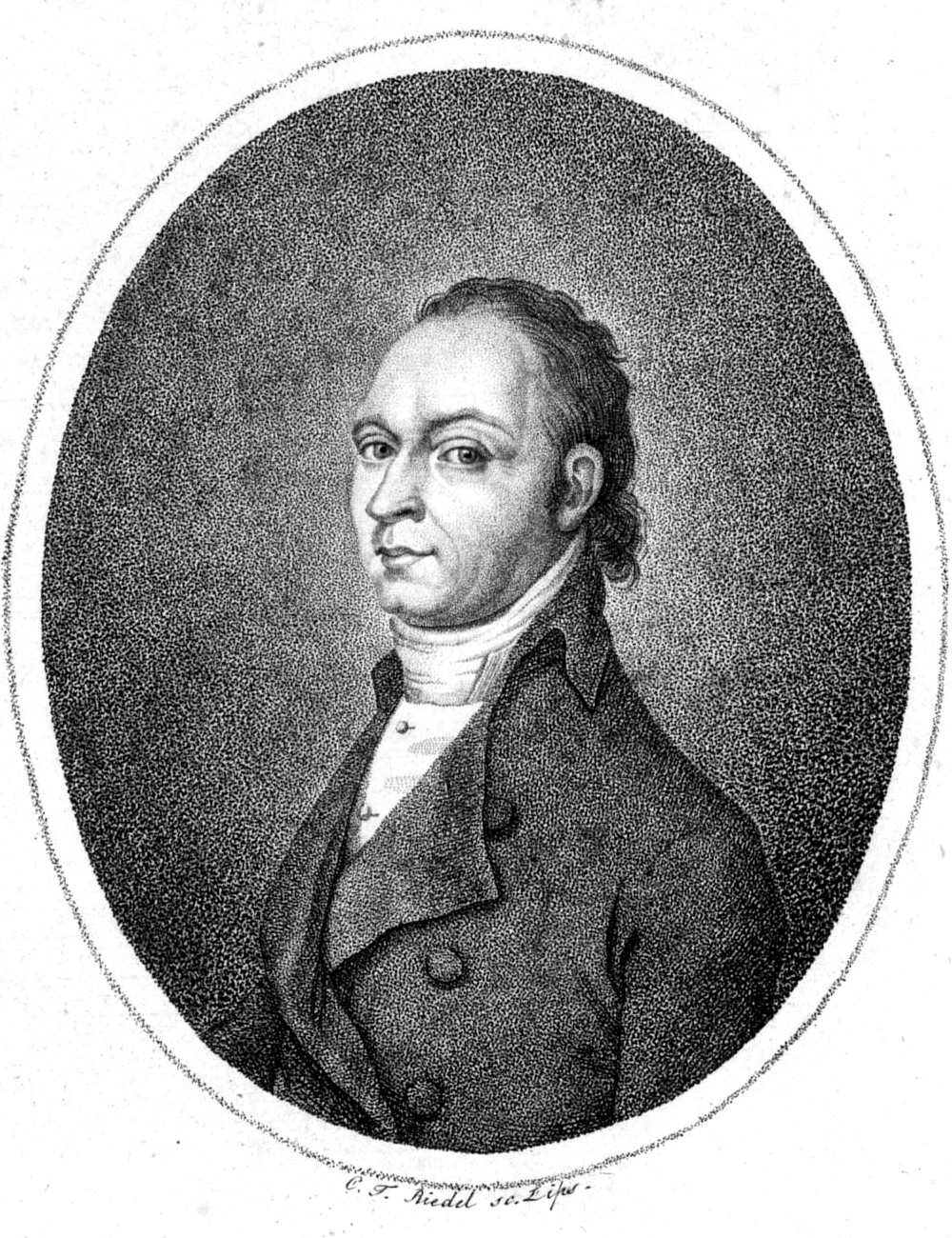
Franz Krommer

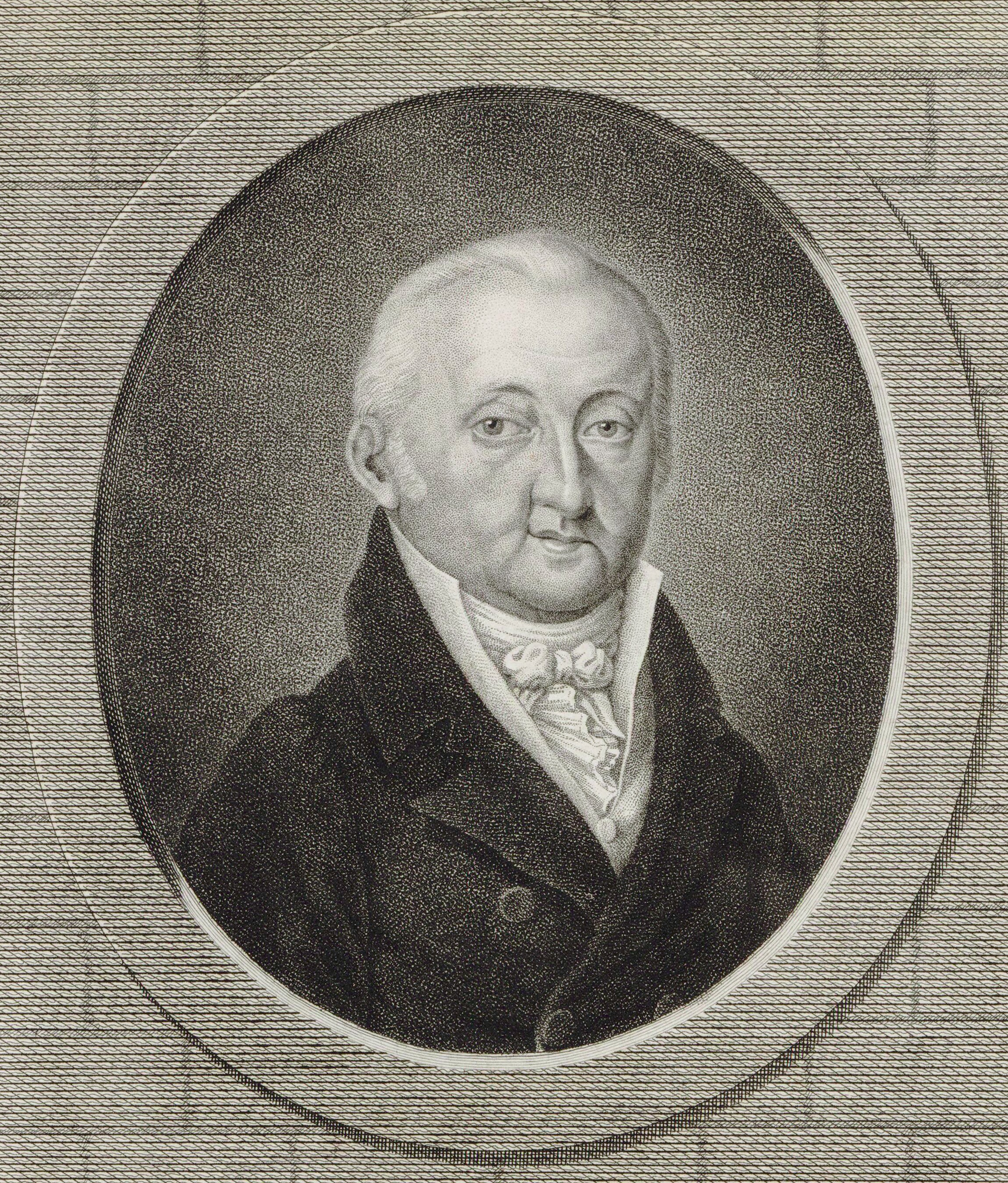
Johann Gottfried Schicht

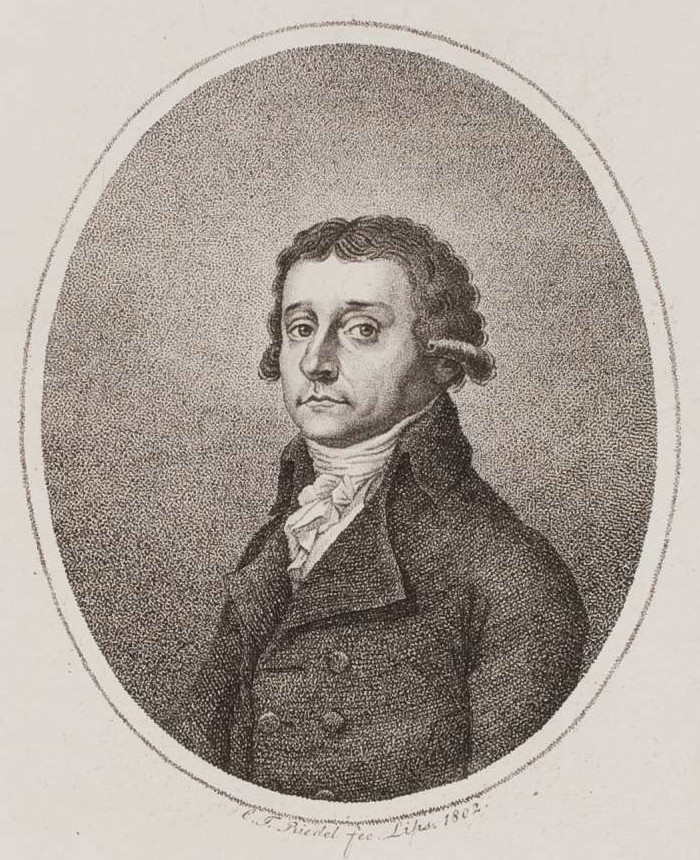
Antonio Salieri

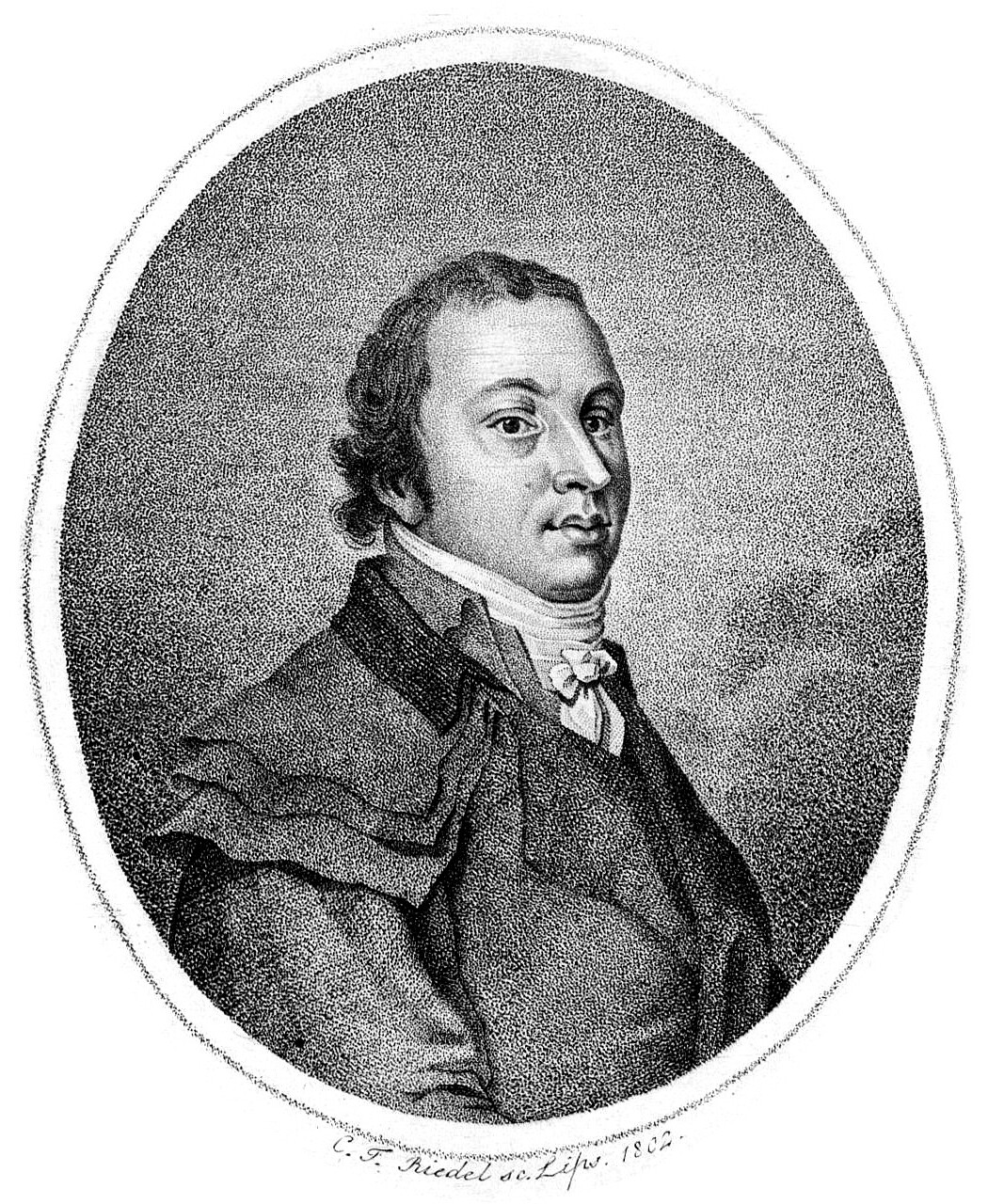
Peter Hänsel
