= Real estate in Italy =

- Total value of Italian Real Estate assets: ▲€ 16 trillion (2025)
- Total value of Italian Real Estate with Catholic Church and Vatican State assets: ▲€ 25 trillion (2025)
- Total value of rentals and tourist short-term rentals in Italy: ▲€ 20 billion (2025)

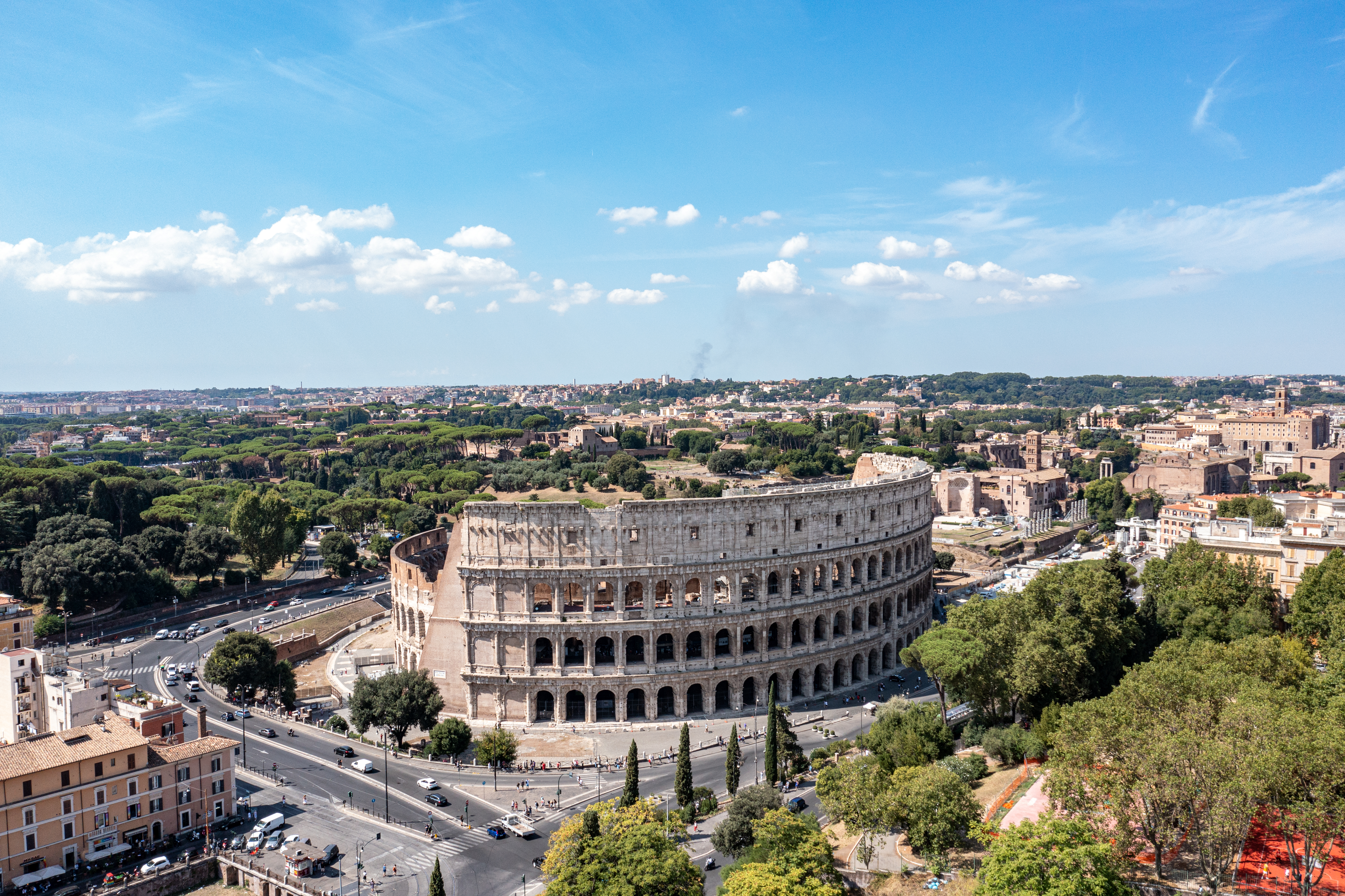
The Colosseum represents this uniqueness in which the patrimonial value goes beyond the sum of the parts of value with which the real estate is estimated, parts that collect the social, cultural, touristic but also artistic, architectural and archaeological aspects in addition to representing a brand or an icon.

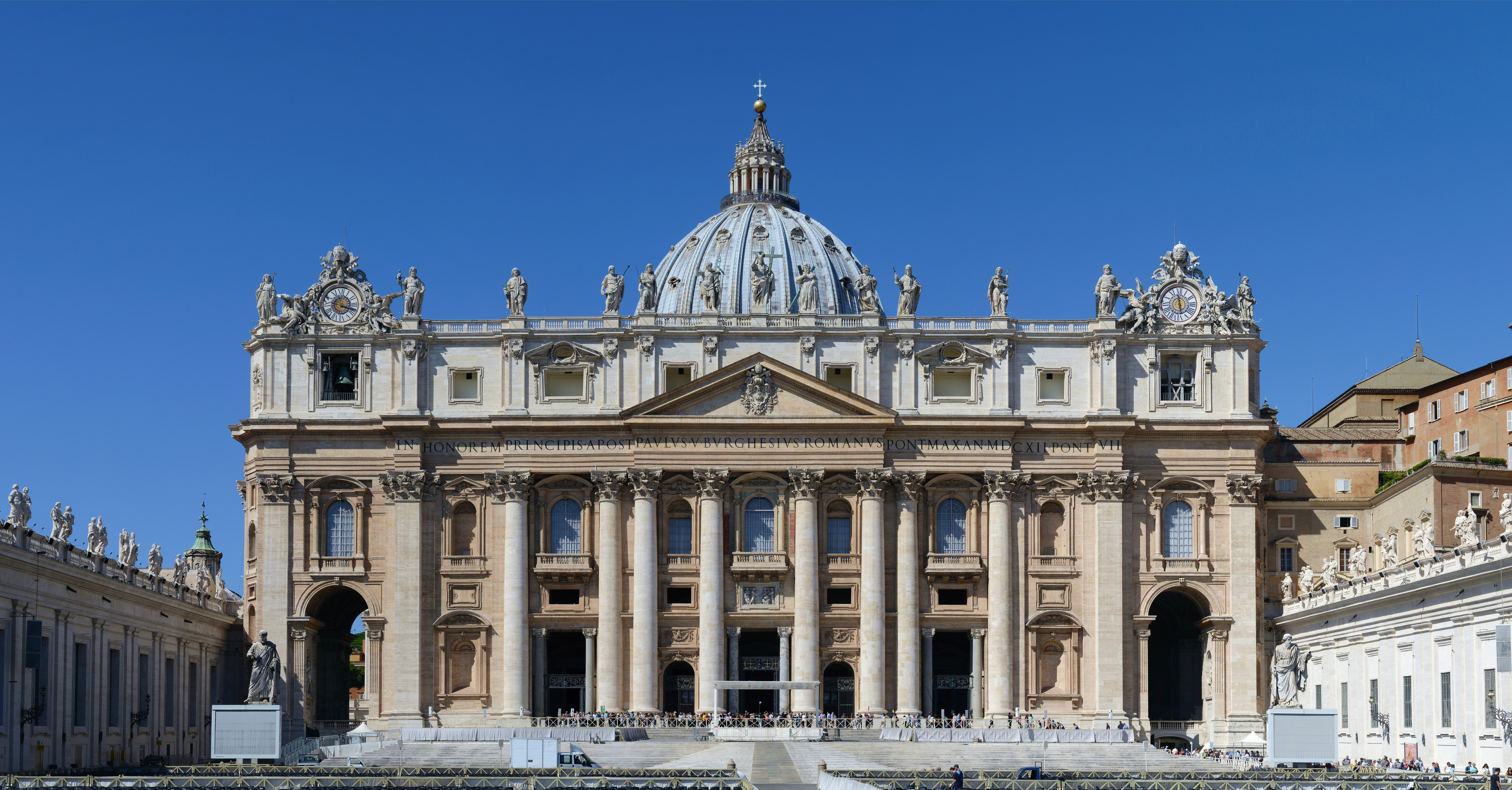
The St. Peter's Basilica represents the immense heritage of the Catholic Church and the Vatican, from the historical, cultural, artistic, architectural but above all religious point of view, a destination for Christians, especially Catholics.

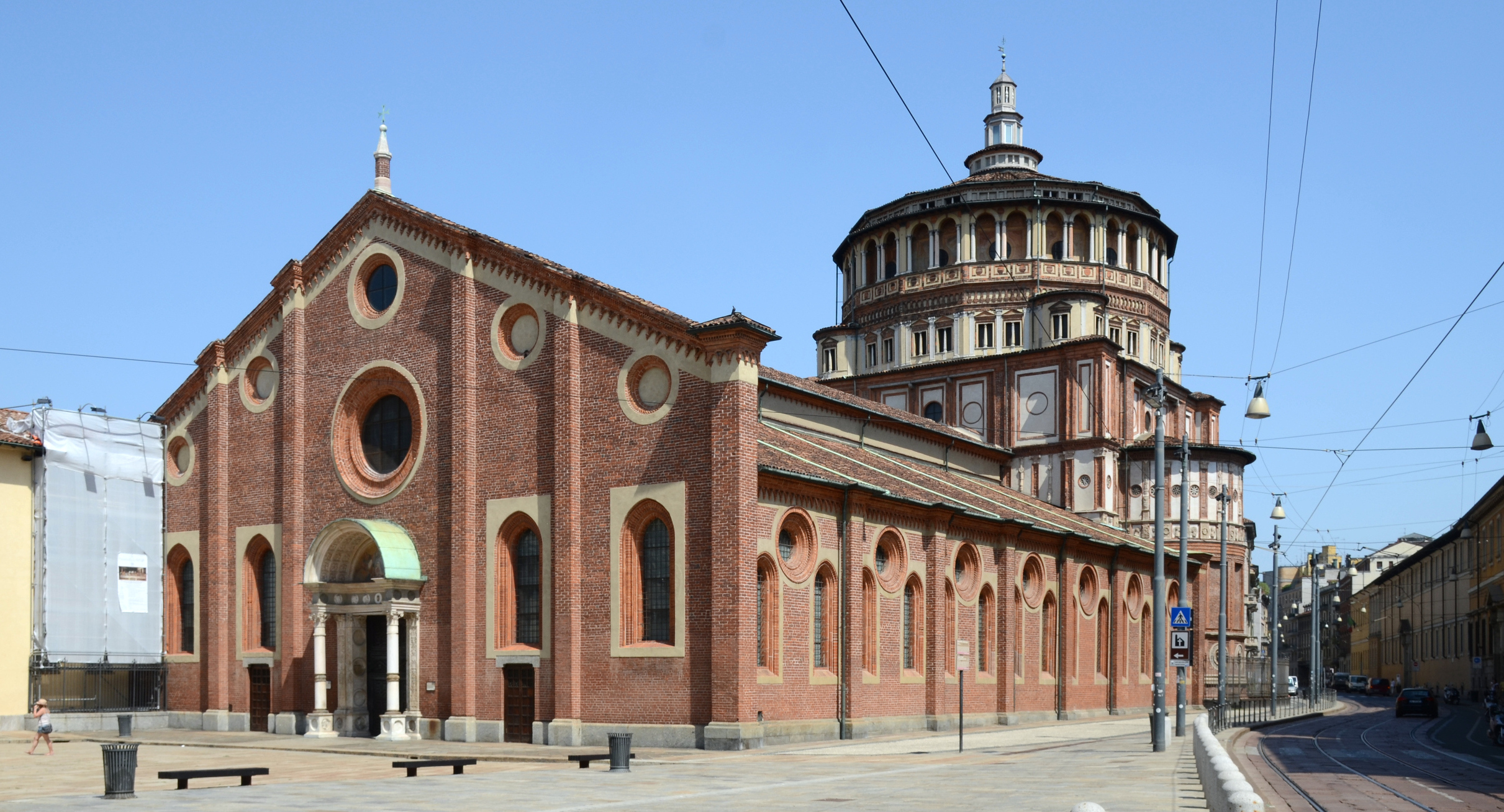
Santa Maria delle Grazie, part of the heritage of the Catholic Church, is a church and Dominican convent in Milan, northern Italy, and a UNESCO World Heritage Site. The convent contains the mural of The Last Supper by Leonardo da Vinci, which is in the refectory.

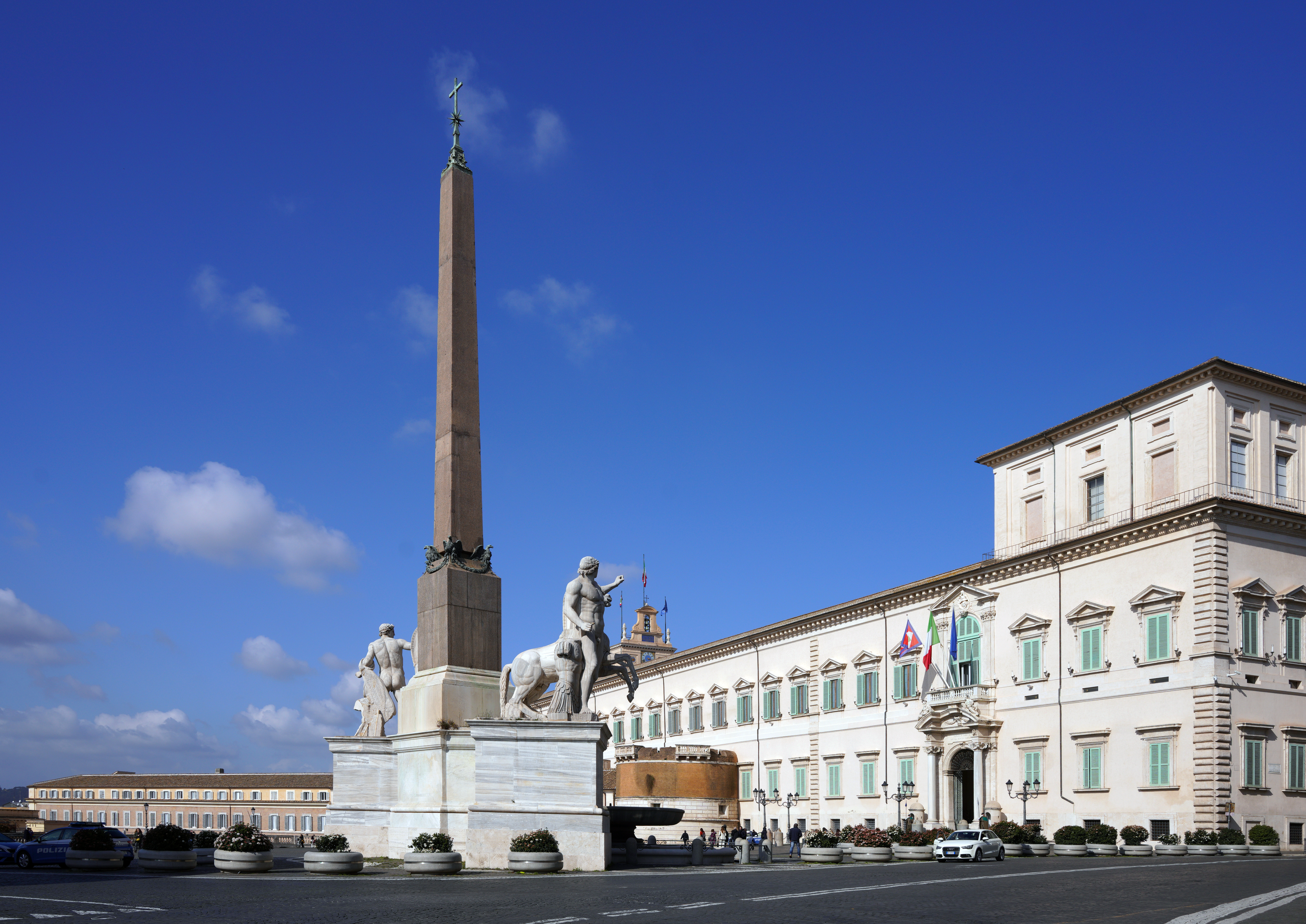
The Palazzo del Quirinale in Rome, originality a papal residence built by Pope Gregory XII, represents part of the Italian real estate heritage, is the main official residence of the President of the Italian Republic.

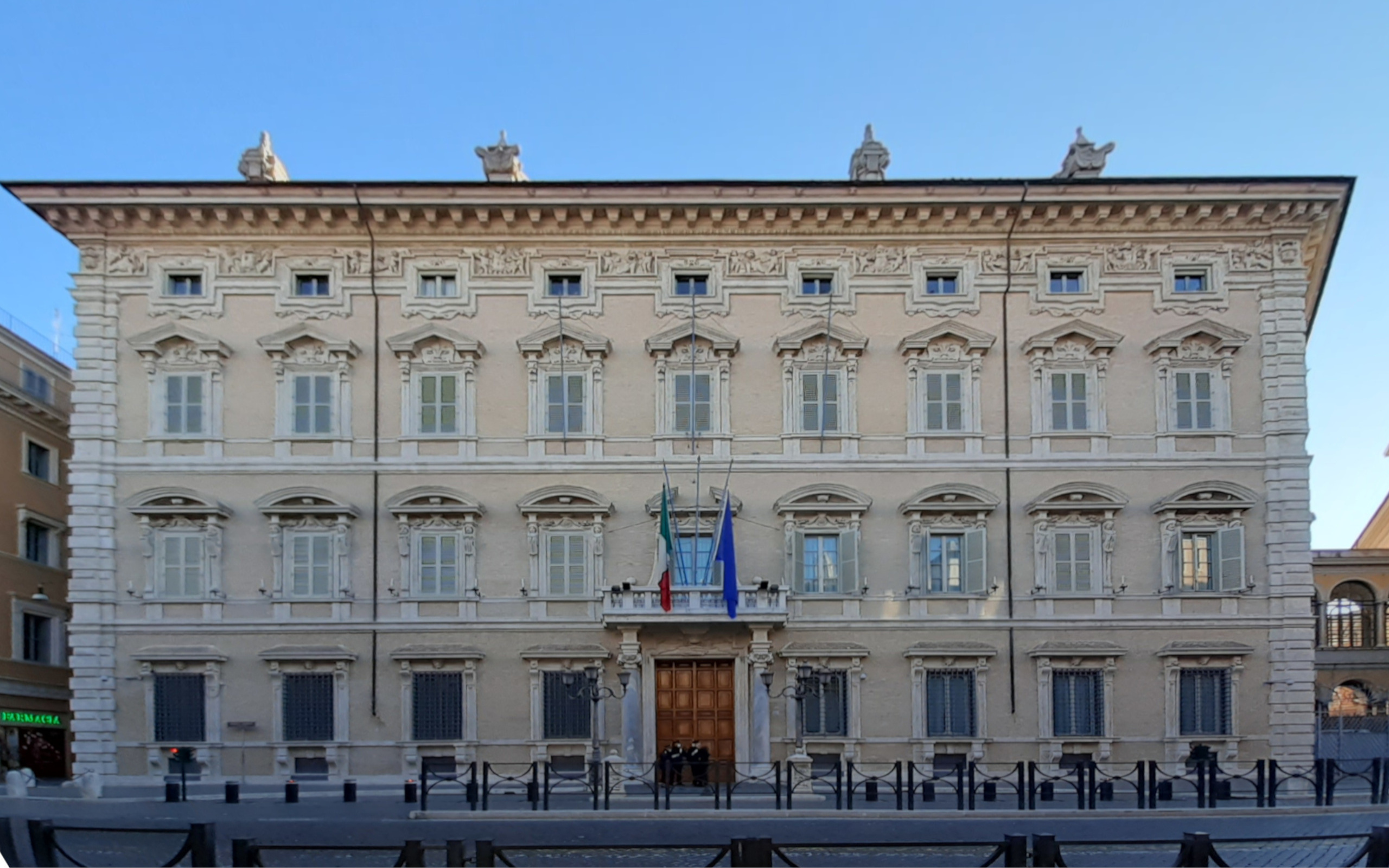
Palazzo Madama in Rome represents part of the Italian real estate heritage, seat of the Senate of the Italian Republic, the upper house of the Italian Parliament.

Real estate in Italy can be divided into two main sectors: residential and commercial. The market is regulated by various professional organizations, including CONFEDILIZIA (representing property owners) and FIAIP (representing real estate agents).

== Social housing and market history ==
Italy has historically faced issues with insufficient social housing, especially in urban areas, where a shortage of residential housing and poor construction quality persisted from the 19th century through the post-WWII period. Between the 1970s and 2016, the Italian real estate market experienced cyclical fluctuations. Following the COVID-19 pandemic, the market saw a decline in 2020 but recovered in 2021 and 2022. The post-pandemic demand has shifted toward larger homes with private outdoor spaces.

== Cultural and economic factors ==
The Italian real estate market is influenced by a cultural emphasis on family ownership of property, with homes often acquired through inheritance. This contrasts with more commercialized markets like those in the United States and the United Kingdom. Moreover, Italy has avoided the severe financial crises caused by overheated real estate markets that affected the U.S. and other European countries in the 20th and 21st centuries, with many scholars arguing that the Italian market is more stable and less prone to drastic price fluctuations.

Italy has always been a country rich in real estate, in particular, luxury property. In 2024, the total value of Italian real estate assets is estimated between 5,000 and 10,000 billion euros. However, recent studies in 2025 on the real estate sector suggest that the exact figure is 16 trillion euros. A figure that takes into account Italy's unique cultural heritage and the overall recent and ongoing investments for its protection. Furthermore, if the assets that reside in Italy but owned by the Catholic Church and the Vatican State are inserted, this estimate is raised at 25 trillions of euros.

In 2024, the Italian real estate market had a significant increase in the sale of residential homes with 15.8%, mortgages for purchase grew by 5.7% and prices increased by 7.8%. In addition, there was a strong increase in purchases by foreigners, mainly from Germany, as well as residents of the United States and the United Kingdom. A total of 8,100 transactions for a value of over 5 billion euros and an average purchase value of around 640 thousand euros. The purchase of luxury and prestigious properties by foreign residents does not only occur for residential or housing purposes, but also as a form of investment.

In 2024, over 75% of Italians will own at least one home. Investing in a residential or holiday home is seen by Italians as a good investment that provides stability and security throughout their lives.

== Background of Italian real estate ==
In 2023, the total value of the real estate market in Italy was approximately 10.2 trillion US dollars or 9.0 trillion euros. Some analysts believe that this market will experience sustained growth in the next five to ten years, driven by foreign investment, urban planning, urban infrastructure development, urbanization, and sustainable development projects.

Real estate in Italy can be broadly divided into the commercial sector and residential sector, among which the residential sector accounts for more than half of the transactions in 2020.

The homeownership rate in Italy is among the highest in Western Europe, reaching 72%. The commercial real estate sector in Italy was about 900 billion euros in 2020, and the northern part of Italy is the most valued site for commercial real estate investment.

The average price of residential properties for sale in April 2025 was about 2,099 euros per square meter, the peak over the past two years. In August 2023, the price was the lowest among the two years, which is 1,971 euros per square meter.

Among regions of Italy, the highest property prices were in Trentino Alto Adige (3,497 euros/m²), and the lowest in Calabria (948 euros/m²).

The Italian real estate market welcomes and sets no restrictions for foreign investment. In 2020, most of the foreign capital invested in Italian real estate came from Germany and the United Kingdom.

The social model of housing in Italy is that houses are often seen as family-based and people often acquire houses through inheritance. This view is different from countries like the United Kingdom and the United States, where houses are traded as financial assets.

The traditional view of housing and weak regulation have led to some illegal construction of low-quality dwellings as a cheap route to home ownership. Since the liberalization of the private rental market in the 1990s, social protection for tenants has also been poor.

== Protection and defense of the territory and real estate assets from threats ==
Unfortunately, this immense real estate heritage is threatened by frequent destructive rains with floods and consequent landslides, earthquakes, arsons, abandonment and neglect, as well as degradation and dirt. All these elements have led to a sharp increase in the costs for their conservation and maintenance for Italian families, which for some in recent years has gradually become unsustainable. The Italian government has intervened by promoting maintenance and energy adaptation work with tax breaks that have helped to partially resolve the cost problem. But not all Italians have been able to access these tax breaks and restore their properties, in particular the lower income brackets, the less wealthy. The so-called "Superbonus 110%" tax measure has not been as effective as it was intended, only upper-middle class Italians have been able to take advantage of these tax benefits and renovate and restore their properties, adapting them to better energy classes. Despite the benefits for the energy transition, it has generated market imbalances and a limited impact on the real estate market. Furthermore, this measure has burdened public spending, not favoring a balanced budget of the Italian state.

In addition to the destructive elements due in part to climate change, there are also social ones that damage real estate assets such as illegal building, illegal occupation, theft, arson, pollution mainly committed by criminals, criminal gangs or criminal organizations. But the Italian State has deployed to combat these destructive elements, a civil protection among the best in the world, firefighters and police forces among the most efficient and organized that have limited and stopped these destructive phenomena. The Italian state has responded to illegal building with demolitions and restoration of the landscape, to illegal occupation with actions of eviction and evacuation of occupied structures, to thefts in homes and villas with arrests of criminal gangs that have blocked and limited the crimes, to the assets of criminal organizations it has responded with confiscation and reassignment, to arsons with preventive actions and control of the territory also with drones and limiting the damage with the work of civil protection, volunteers and the fire brigade, to pollution of the territory it has responded with actions of reclamation and restoration of the landscape. In conclusion, in recent years the Italian state has been increasingly determined to take actions to protect the territory and real estate.

== Redevelopment of the territory and real estate assets ==
In recent years, the Italian state, through local institutions, has been strongly committed to urban redevelopment with the demolition of dilapidated or degraded buildings both from a constructive and social point of view. An emblematic example is the demolition of the sails of Scampia in Naples, a symbol of architectural, social and moral degradation, that for decades was under the control of criminal organizations. The Italian State is currently carrying out a redevelopment action in Caivano, a model or method that it wants to extend to all parts of Italy. However, there is still much to be done to rehabilitate situations of urban decay, as currently happens, with city areas in the hands of criminal gangs of illegal immigrants. Criminal gangs composed mainly of illegal immigrants often compete for control of the territory for drug dealing and often under the management of criminal organizations give rise to frequent episodes of violence such as fights and acts of violence such as theft and rape against Italian citizens and tourists. These areas, which may be parts of towns and neighborhoods, may experience a temporary depreciation of the real estate assets depending on whether the degradation phenomenon continues or not. In recent years, Milan, for example, like many other Italian cities, has undergone this type of criminal evolution. The Italian state's response to these criminals is containment and repression with arrests, removals and expulsions from the national territory depending on the seriousness of the crimes.

== Social housing ==
Although the homeownership rate in Italy is high, Italy still maintains a series of social and welfare housing projects.

There are three types of supported housing in Italy:

- Subsidized housing: rental housing provided by the public sector to low-income populations. Rents are about 25% of the market rate.
- Assisted housing: housing for both rent and sale, provided to low- and middle-income populations, with subsidies between 10%-60% of the cost.
- Agreed housing: private housing for rent or sale, with prices regulated by agreements between providers and municipalities.

In recent years, with the rise in housing prices and the instability of job opportunities, many people have difficulty obtaining stable housing. Some scholars believe that the proportion of social rent is too small, about 5.5% in 2015, and therefore is not enough to meet social needs.

Poggio and Boreiko claim that, in 2015, there were about 650,000 households queuing for a social housing dwelling. They argue that a serious problem in the social housing system in Italy is the lack of resources to maintain existing social houses and make further expansions. Another issue is that social housing is not always allocated to those who need it the most.

Poggio and Boreiko state that the criteria for allocation are sometimes conflicting and do not consider possible changes in the applicants' circumstances. They further argue that social housing in Italy has not yet met the housing demand of low-income households, although it is moving in that direction.

The future trend in the social housing system is to modify its criteria so that social housing can be allocated to those who need it most . Another trend is to address resource allocation and management issues to achieve sustainable development in social housing.

== Relevant organizations ==
=== CONFEDILIZIA ===
CONFEDILIZIA is a professional association that represents property owners, including individual owners and large investors in Italy.

The main objective of CONFEDILIZIA is to protect the rights of property owners in Italy. CONFEDILIZIA would provide training and conferences to its members to keep them aware of the latest information about real estate in Italy. They also provide legal services to property owners to address some legal, fiscal, and technical issues related to real estate. In addition, CONFEDILIZIA also organizes lobbying activities. In the case of the 2019 Italian Budget Law, CONFEDILIZIA lobbied for the flat rate text on commercial rental contracts to fight against vacant premises with commercial purpose caused by high taxation. However, finally, they did not achieve fully satisfactory results as the application of the flat rate tax was limited to contracts concluded in 2019.

=== FIAIP ===
The Italian Federation of Professional Real Estate Agents is another major professional association. Recognized by the European Community, FIAIP is a trade association that consists of more than 10 thousand real estate agents, 15 thousand real estate agencies, 45 thousand industry professionals, and 500 credit consultants. FIAIP holds 105 branches and 20 regional offices in Italy, providing consultancy, informational, and union protections to its members.

A major function of FIAIP is to monitor the Italian real estate market and present data. It also makes proposals for the amendments of the sector of real estate, and some of its proposals have been approved and applied by the Parliament and the Government.

FIAIP also serves to regulate the real estate market in Italy. Collaborating and negotiating with social partners, FIAIP has set the work regulations for real estate agents, called the first-level National Collective Labor Agreement (C.C.N.L.) in the real estate sector. In addition, FIAIP founded EBNAIP (National Bilateral Body for Professional Real Estate Agents), promoting the application of C.C.N.L., and providing professional training and healthcare services for real estate agents. It also holds the certification exams for real estate agents, as part of its regulations of the sector.

== History ==
During the millennia and centuries, Italy, for mild climate and for the great variety of climatic environments, offered the perfect place for the construction of luxury real estate and of great artistic and cultural value.

In the Italian peninsula there are numerous archaeological testimonies of inhabited settlements or buildings in prehistoric times, of pre-Nuragic, Nuragic, Phoenician and Punic civilizations, particularly in Sardinia.

=== Mesolithic ===
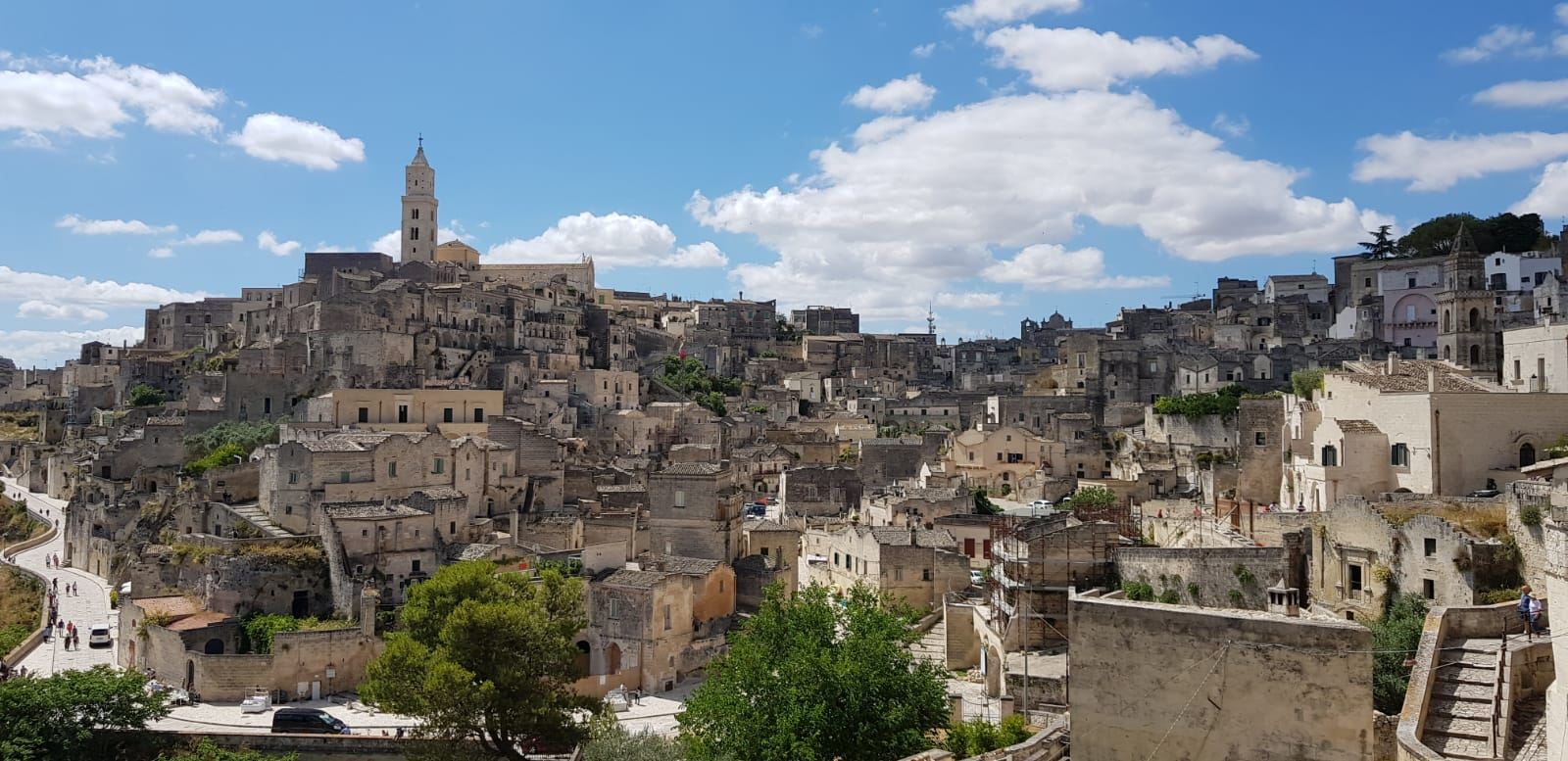
Matera, Basilicata

Matera, its rock-cut urban core, whose twin cliffside zones are known collectively as the Sassi di Matera, was inhabited with continuous occupation dating back to the Mesolithic, between the 10th millennium BC and the 7th millennium BC. The Sassi are houses dug into the calcarenitic rock itself, which is characteristic of Basilicata and Apulia. The term sasso derives from Latin saxum, meaning a hill, rock or great stone.

=== Neolithic ===
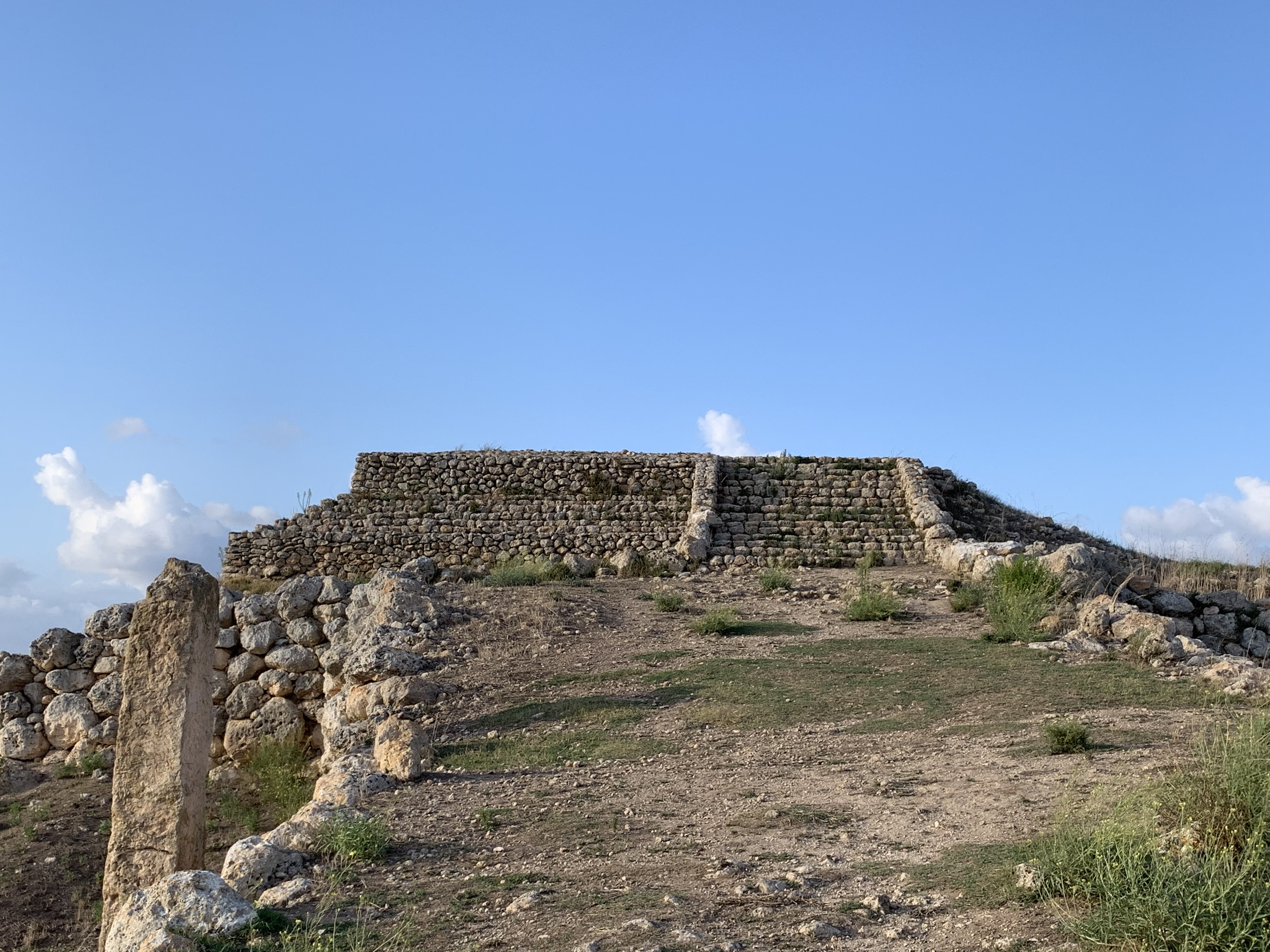
The Neolithic temple of Monte d'Accoddi

The oldest building in Italy is the Altar of Monte d'Accoddi, located in Sardinia, with the oldest parts dated to around 4000–3650 BC. Unfortunately, all that remains visible today is the base and the stone stairs, while the real construction was made of wood.

=== Nuragic ===
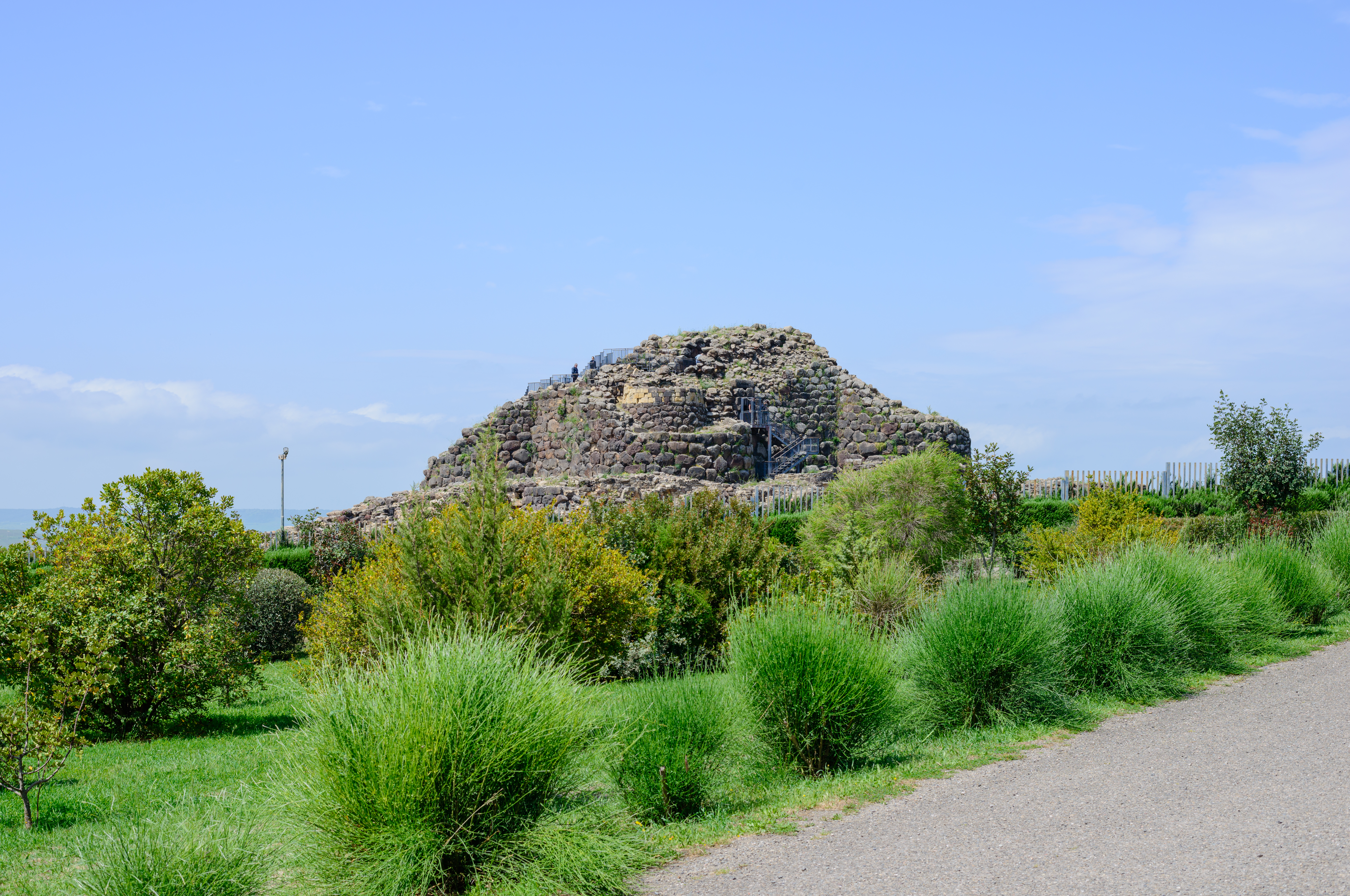
Nuraghe Su Nuraxi, Barumini, Sardinia

Among the numerous testimonies of the Nuragic civilization that have been discovered in Sardinia, the most significant and ancient are Su Nuraxi of Barumini recognized as a UNESCO World Heritage Site and Nuraghe Santu Antine in Torralba, Sardinia.

=== Phoenicians ===
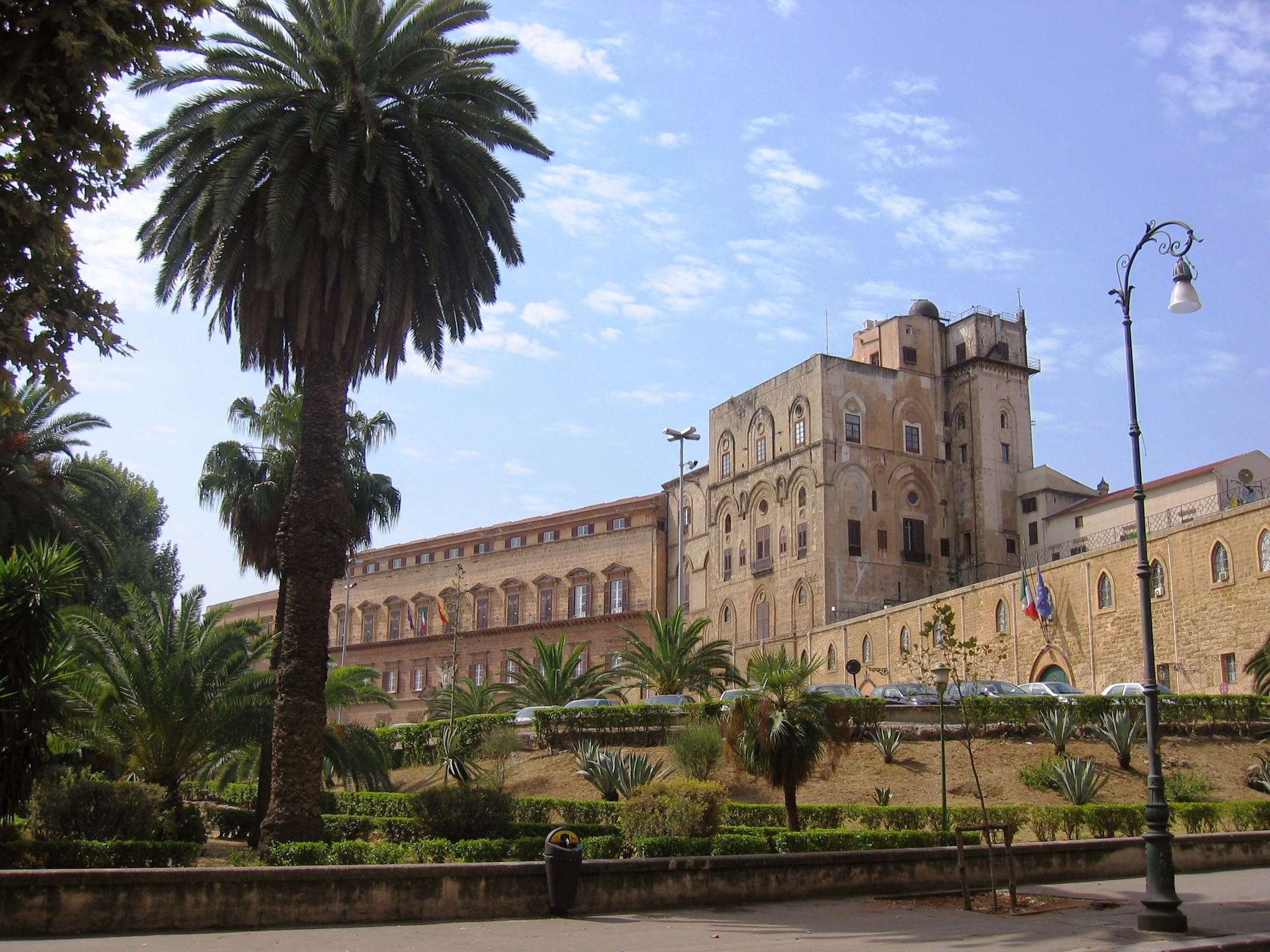
Palazzo dei Normanni incorporates in its foundations stratifications of the first fortified settlements of Phoenician-Punic origin dating back to between the 8th and 5th centuries BC. Palermo, Sicily

Among the colonies in Italy founded by the Phoenicians, the greatest testimony is undoubtedly the foundation of the city of Palermo, which took place in the 8th century BC, even if there are traces of a more ancient past, of neighbouring areas inhabited even in prehistoric times. The Phoenician colony was called 'Zyz' which in Phoenician means flower. It soon became the most important Phoenician colony of the so-called Phoenician triangle, including Motya and Soluntum. This older initial settlement was followed by another of Greek origin, called Paleapolis and subsequently a second one also of Greek origin called Neapolis, an expansion towards the sea of the first of Greek origin, both gave rise to a single settlement called Panormos, bordered by two waterways, thus creating an immense natural port, which became a possession of Carthage, until the First Punic War (264-241 BC) following which Sicily was conquered by the Romans.

=== Etruscans ===
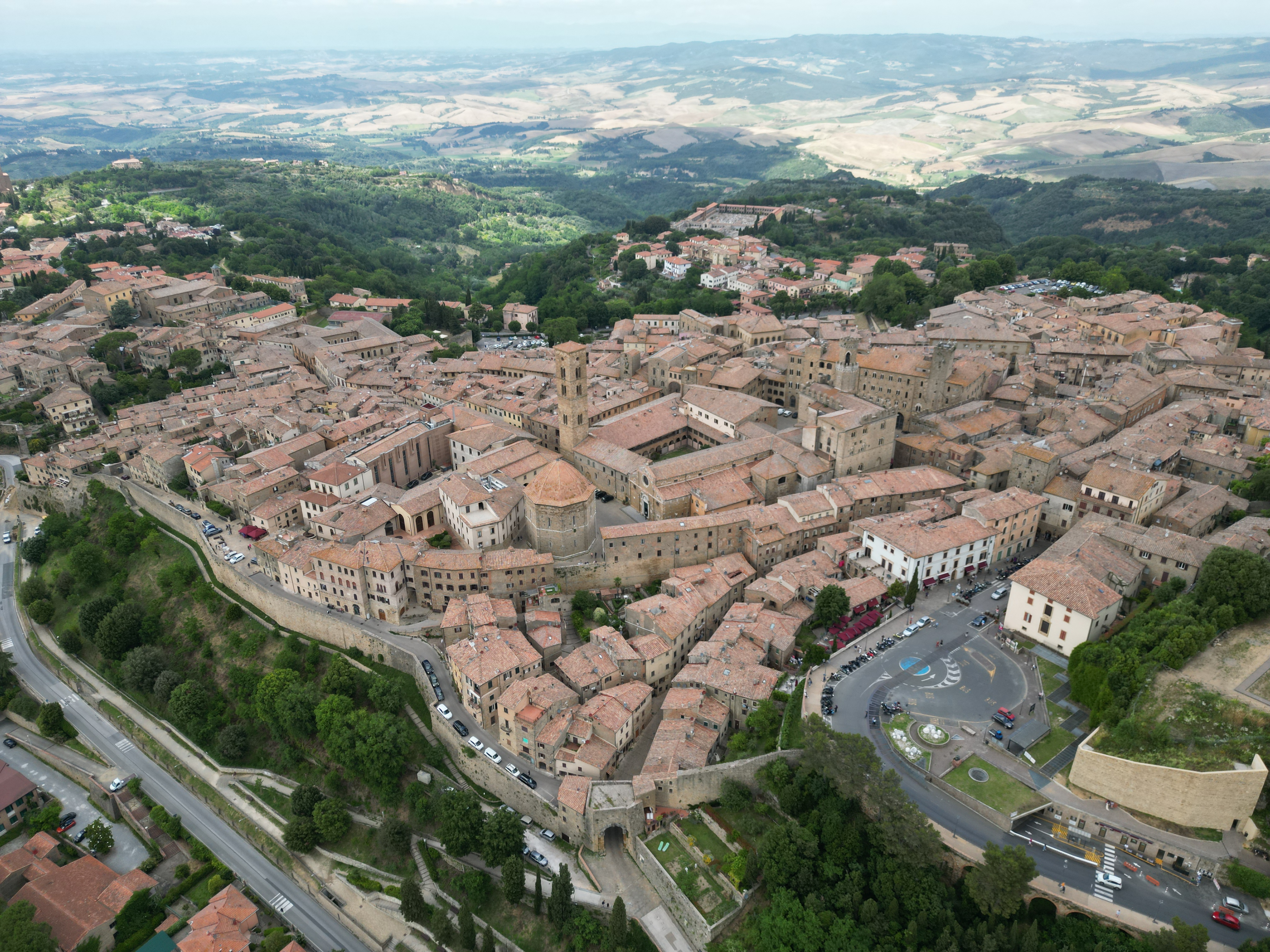
Volterra has substantial structures from the Etruscan, Roman, and Medieval periods.

The Etruscans were among the first civilizations to reside on the Italian Peninsula, and gave a fundamental contribution to subsequent civilizations such as the Roman one in the foundation of cities and inhabited centers. An emblematic example is the city of Volterra, founded by the Etruscans. Volterra was one of the Etruscan dodecapolis.

=== Magna Graecia ===
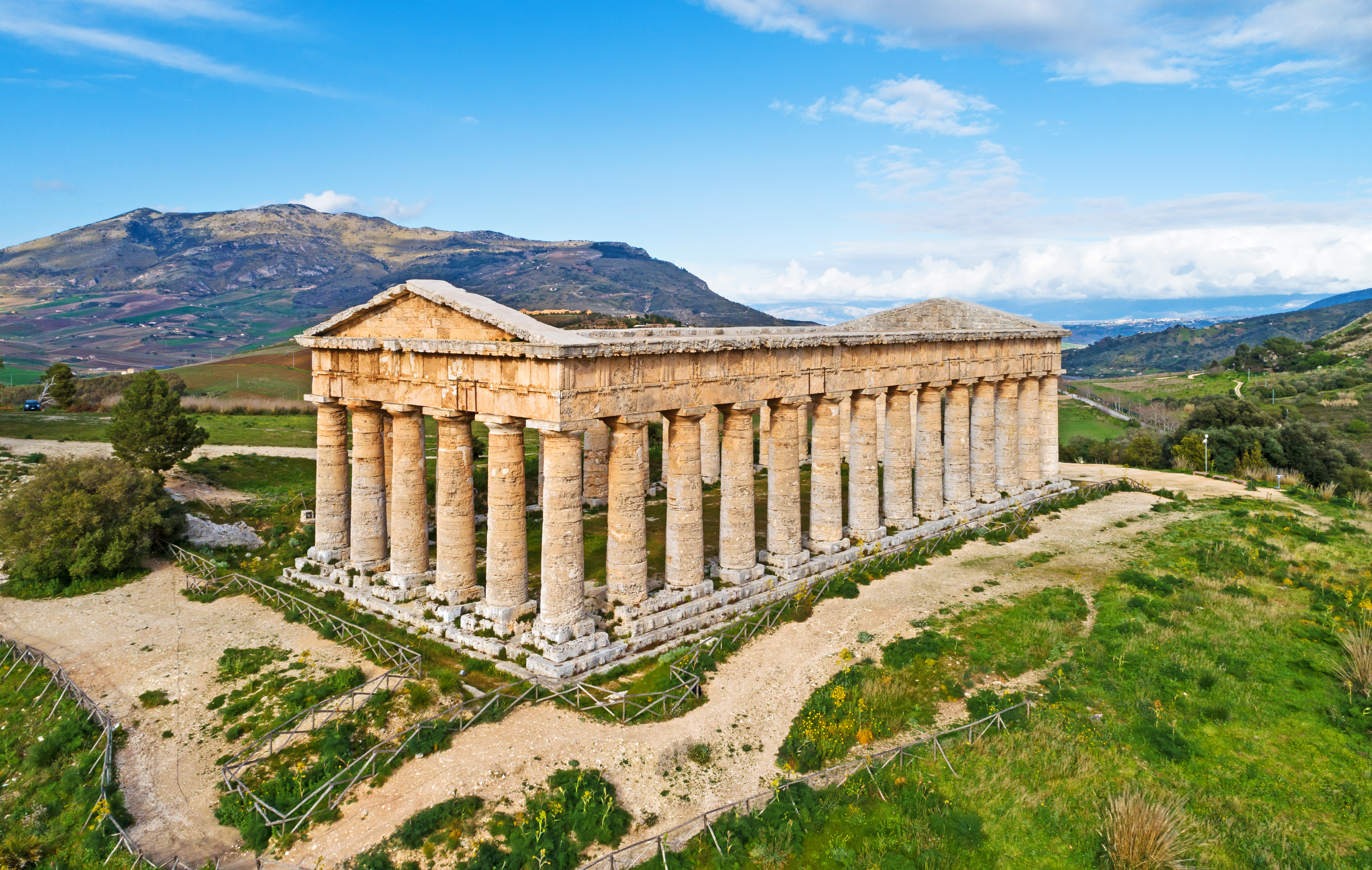
The Doric temple of Segesta, Province of Trapani

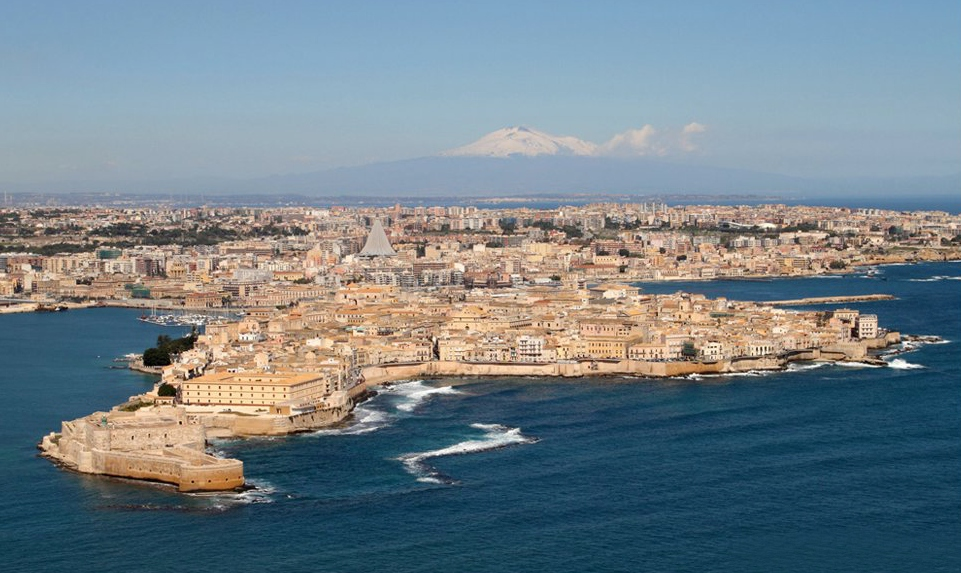
Ortygia island, where Syracuse, Sicily was founded in ancient Greek times

The Greek colonies in the south of the Italian peninsula, known as Magna Graecia, gave another fundamental contribution to the development of cities and inhabited centers in the Italian peninsula, and they too, like the Etruscan ones, played an essential role in the expansion and evolution of Roman civilization. Clear examples are Neapolis (Naples) and Syrakousai (Syracuse).

=== Ancient Rome ===
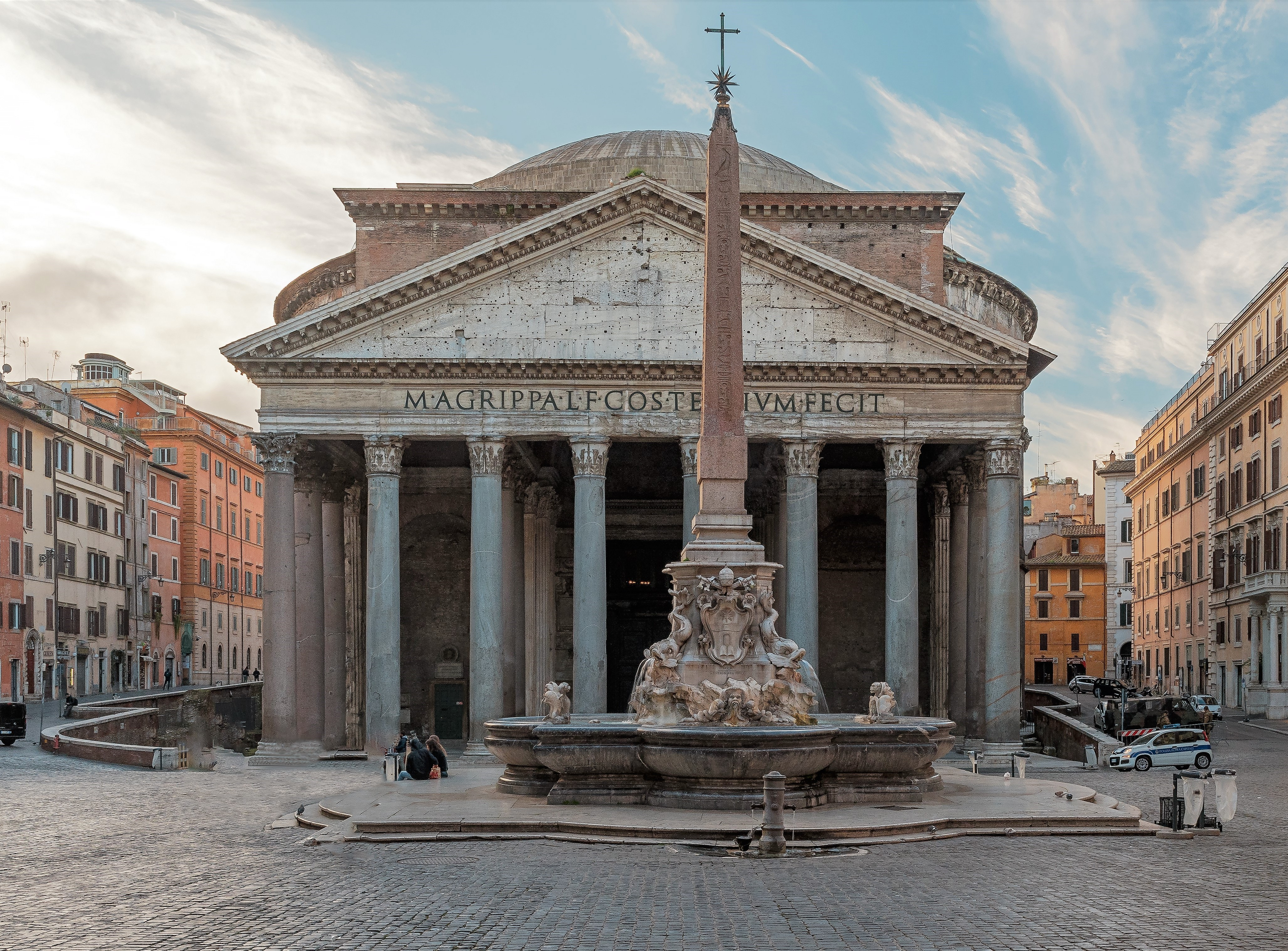
Pantheon, Rome

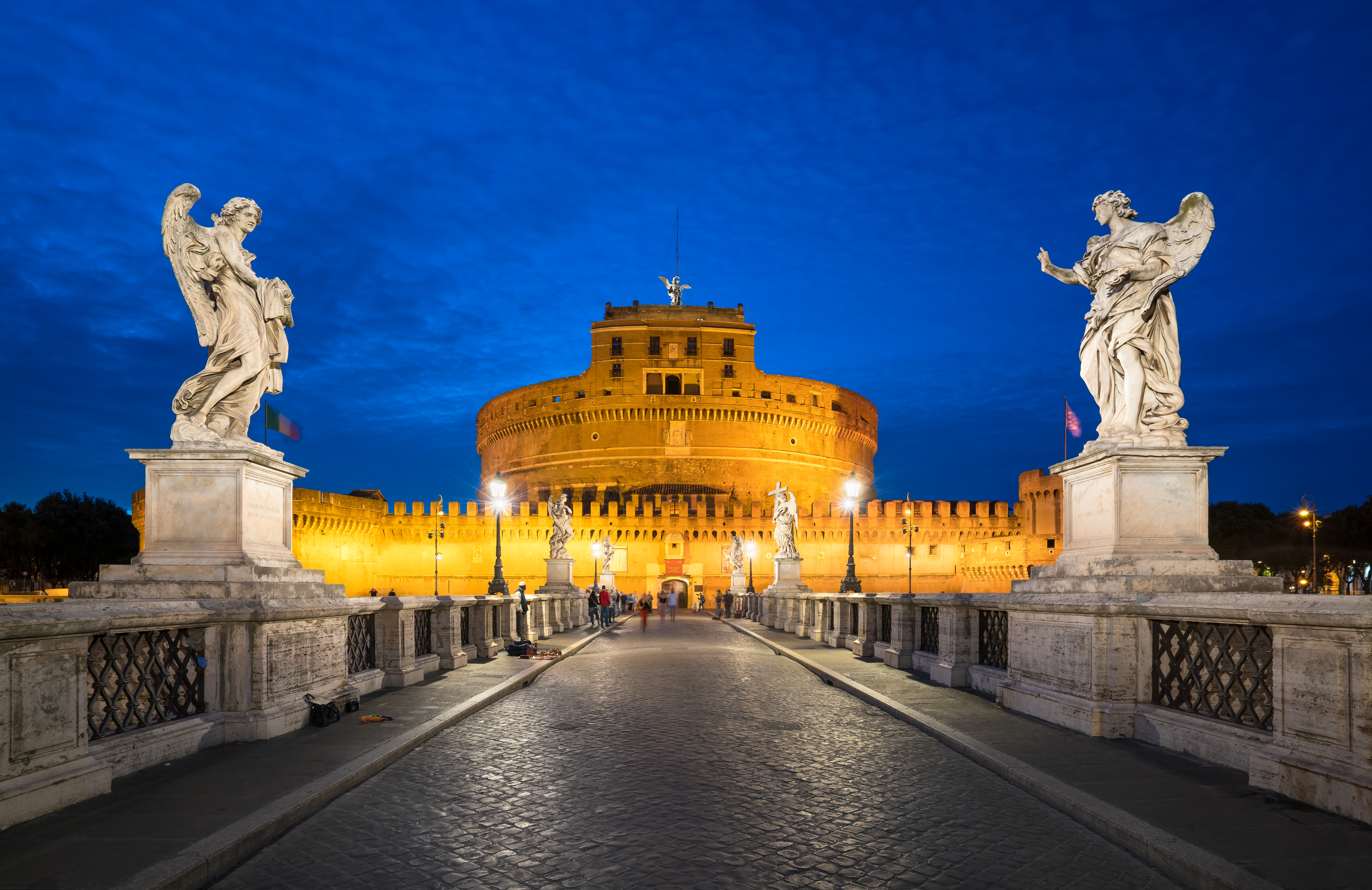
Castel Sant'Angelo from the Ponte Sant'Angelo. The top statue is of Michael the Archangel, the angel from whom the building derives its name.

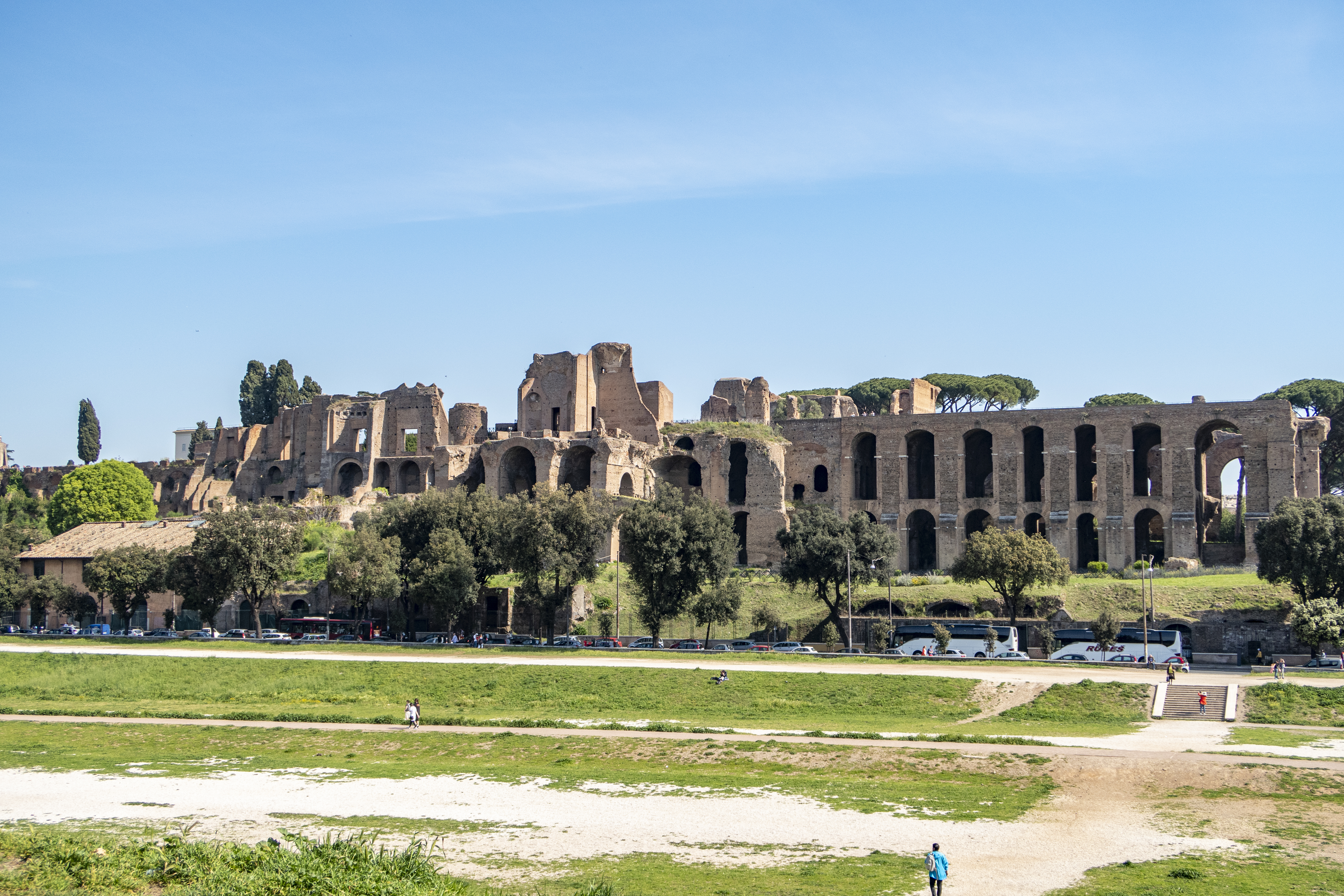
Overview of the imperial palace complex from the Circus Maximus. Particularly notable are portions of the Domus Augustana on the left (on the western side) and the Domus Severiana on the right (on the eastern side).

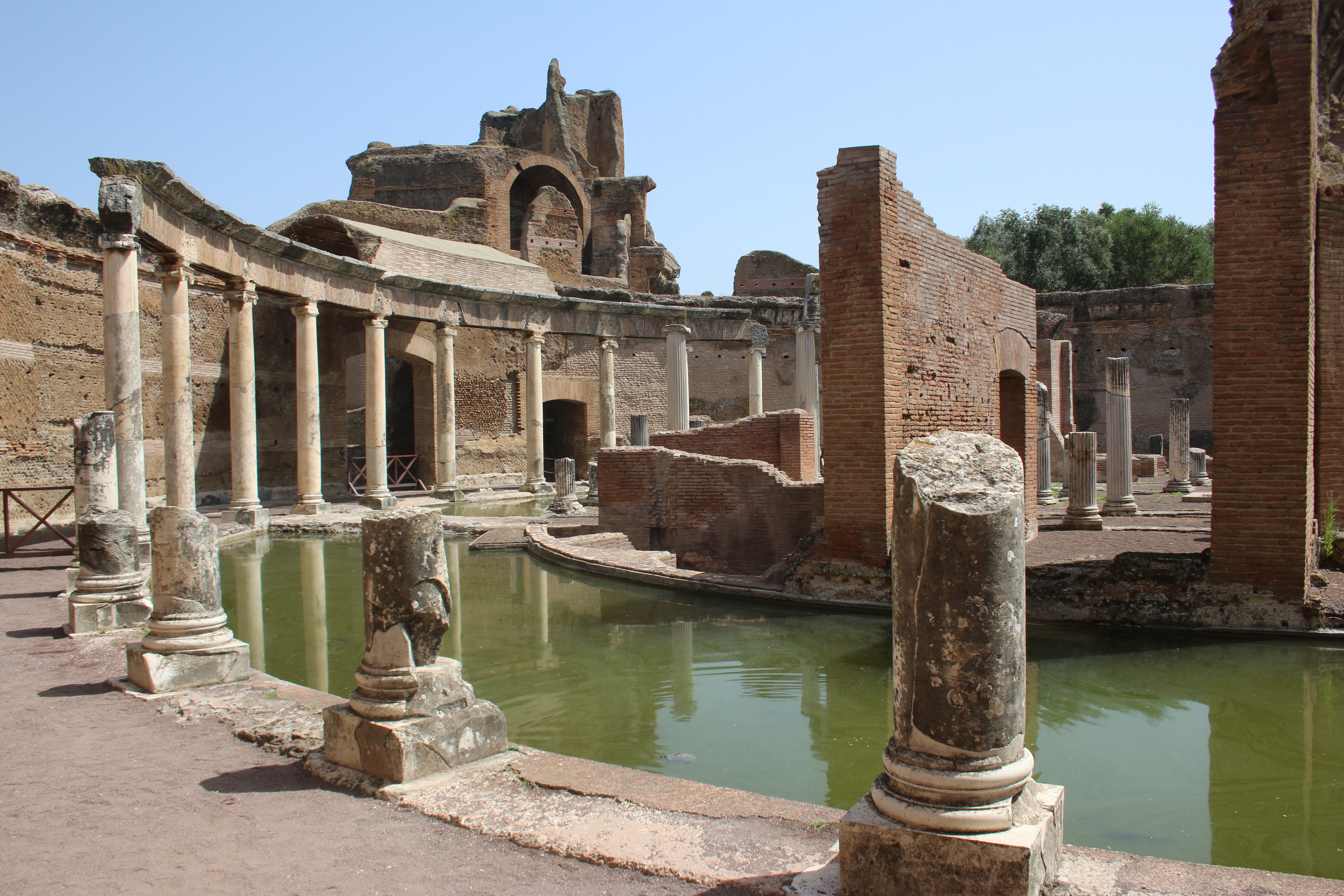
Villa Adriana in Tivoli

Roman civilization has had a fundamental importance in the constitution of the Italian real estate heritage, first of all because it has assimilated within itself previous civilizations such as the Etruscan, the Greek, both of Magna Graecia and of ancient Greece, having conquered both territories, and that of all the other peoples of the Italian peninsula, such as the Samnites, Volsci, Osci, etc. Furthermore, its expansion throughout the Mediterranean basin and in almost all of the European continent, including England, has provided the foundations of many European cities and of the entire Mediterranean basin. The legacy of the Roman Empire, despite the destruction carried out by the barbarians who partly determined its fall, is enormous, both from a constructive and structural point of view and from a cultural point of view: roads, bridges, aqueducts, theatres, amphitheatres, temples which many later became churches, monuments, mausoleums, buildings and villas. An immense legacy, first depauterated and robbed in the Middle Ages and the Italian Renaissance and then rediscovered and recovered in the following centuries. The most significant and greatest heritage is certainly in Rome, which was the capital of the Empire, but also throughout the Italian peninsula the contribution is extraordinary. The Colosseum or Flavian Amphitheatre is the largest and most significant heritage in Rome, the Phanteon, which was a temple dedicated to all the gods, which later was converted into a Christian church, with its dome is an extraordinary example of Ancient Roman engineering, the Castel Sant'Angelo or Mausoleum of Hadrian and its bridge, the Circus Maximus, the Roman Forums and thousands of other buildings that make up the huge archaeological and real estate heritage of Rome. The list of ancient monuments in Rome offers a more precise picture of this immense heritage. Unfortunately, many monuments were damaged, first of all the Colosseum, with the Fall of the Western Roman Empire, not so much due to the destruction wrought by the barbarians, nor to abandonment and neglect or due to natural events, but rather due to the reuse of materials for the construction of new buildings in the Middle Ages and the Renaissance. However, as in many other civilizations, rebuilding, expanding and renewing was also the prerogative of Roman civilization and therefore Rome is also a stratified city, whose soil hides immense archaeological treasures. In underground Rome there are ancient streets, domus, baths, aqueducts and immense catacombs. The Domus Aurea, built by order of the Emperor Nero, is the perfect testimony of what these changes were during the Roman Empire. Forgotten for centuries, it was rediscovered by chance at the end of the 15th century, when a young Roman accidentally fell into a hole on the side of the Oppian Hill and found himself in a strange cave, covered with painted figures. It was called Aurea because it was built and embellished with gold and precious materials, however it is believed never completed, consisting of a set of buildings and green spaces constituting a true luxurious urban villa. Beyond this immense villa, Emperor Nero resided in the splendid Imperial Palaces of the Palatine Hill which overlooked the Roman Forum to the north, and the Circus Maximus to the south. The Palatine Hill was so important that the word palace itself derives from the name of the hill. The Roman Emperors, in addition to residing in the palaces on the Palatine Hill, built immense and splendid villas outside Rome, such as UNESCO World Heritage Site Hadrian's Villa in Tivoli. While Emperor Tiberius built 12 villas in Capri, including Villa Jovis. However, today there are only 3 villas that have clearly preserved their original structure still visible: Villa Jovis, Villa Damecuta and Palazzo a Mare.

The domus was a type of dwelling used in ancient Rome. It was a private urban domicile and was distinguished from the villa suburbana, which was a private dwelling located outside the city walls, and from the villa rustica, located in the countryside and equipped with specific rooms for agricultural work. The domus was the home of rich patrician families, while the poor classes lived in small buildings called insulae.

Among the numerous, well-preserved legacies of the Roman Empire, in the form of cities and buildings, were the cities of Pompeii, Herculaneum, Stabiae and many surrounding villas buried under 4 to 6 meter of volcanic ash and pumice in the eruption of Mount Vesuvius in 79 AD.

=== Luxury real estate ===
The word itself luxury derived from the Latin luxus, and associated with real estate, indicates today in Italy, a category of properties of particular value and of high historical and artistic value. Furthermore, the etymology of the word Palace, in Italian Palazzo, from the Latin name palātium, for Palatine Hill in Rome which housed the emperor's residence.

=== Middle Ages ===
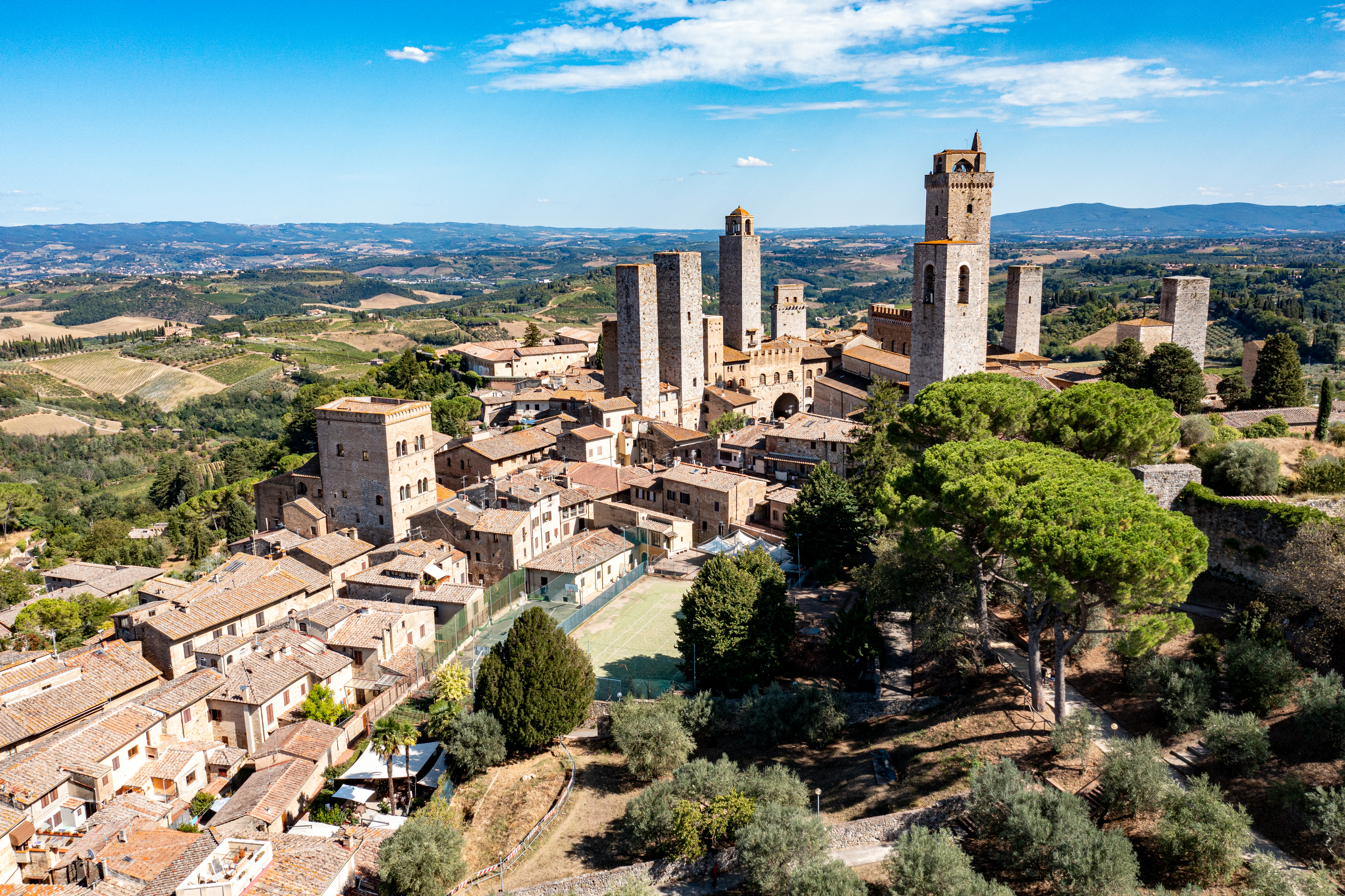
Towers in San Gimignano

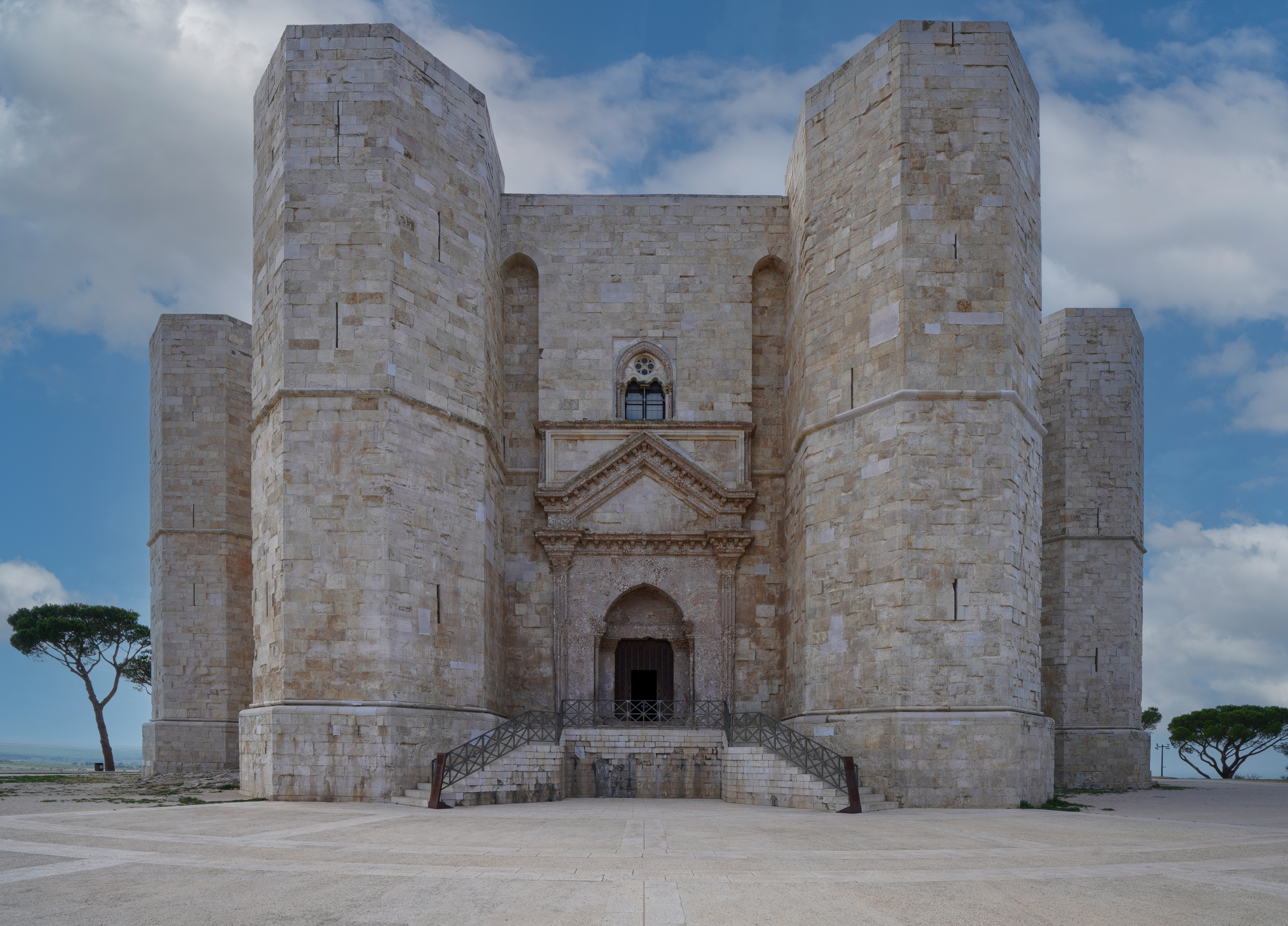
Castel del Monte, Andria

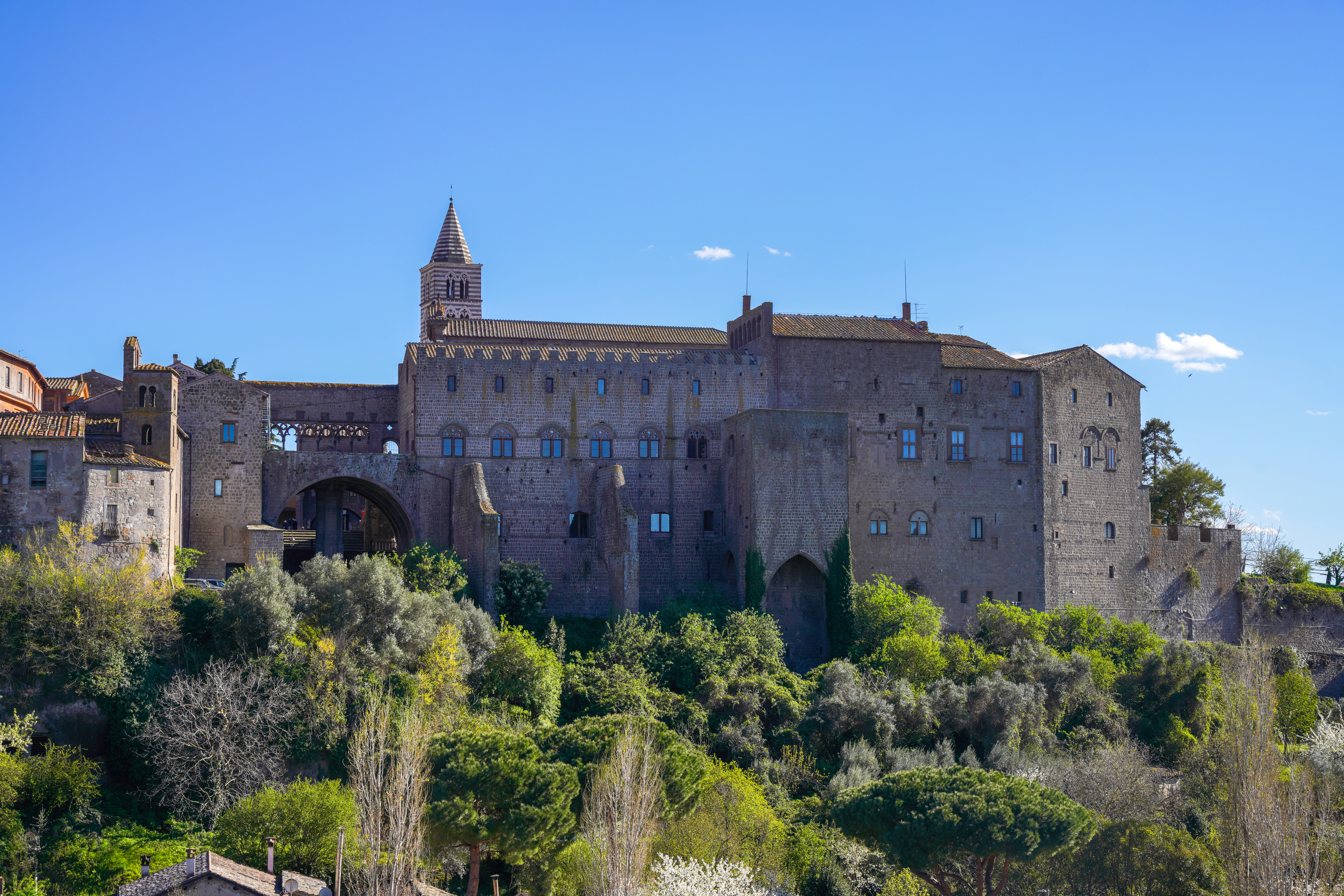
Palazzo dei Papi, Viterbo

The dissolution of the Western Roman Empire brings in Italy the creation of many barbarian kingdoms, as, for example, Kingdom of the Lombards, that evolved over the centuries in feudal lordships. During this period were built the medieval villages with fortified walls and towers. Because of widespread fragmentation in kingdoms and feudal lords, often at war with each other, were built castles and fortresses, often embedded in medieval villages. Today some are protected as Heritage of inestimable value and as UNESCO World Heritage Site, as, for example, The "Historic Centre of San Gimignano", in Tuscany or Castel del Monte, Andria in Apulia. These villages, also called borghi, from burgus, fortified by walls and towers, evolved from Roman cities, which in turn evolved from the castrum and the oppidum. The village was a place of exchange and trade. The flourishing trade favored the rise of a new social class, the borghesia. The cities, increasingly rich and size with trade, free themselves from the imperial control of the Holy Roman Empire, ascending to become autonomous communes governed by a doge, as for Genoa and Venice or feudal overlords and the noble class. This period saw the clash between Guelphs and Ghibellines for the predominance of power between the Pope and the Emperor. These cities become city-states, rich and powerful to extend their dominion over smaller cities and villages. Genoa, Venice, Pisa and Amalfi became powerful maritime republics. Among the medieval towers of the maritime republics, the most significant are the Torre degli Embriaci in Genoa and the Leaning Tower of Pisa. Medieval Italy was fragmented into numerous states or administrative units that evolved in their specificity. The real estate heritage of medieval origin in Italy is still well preserved. Most of these have been kept mostly original, while another minority of these buildings have undergone modifications and expansions becoming incorporated into Renaissance buildings and which have then undergone further modifications in later periods. Another even smaller part has instead been lost or destroyed to make way for new buildings or roads or following earthquakes or war events. The largest and best preserved medieval quarter in Europe is the medieval quarter of San Pellegrino in Viterbo. However, during the Second World War, Viterbo also suffered serious damage to its cultural heritage, leaving a third of the city destroyed or severely damaged.

=== Renaissance ===
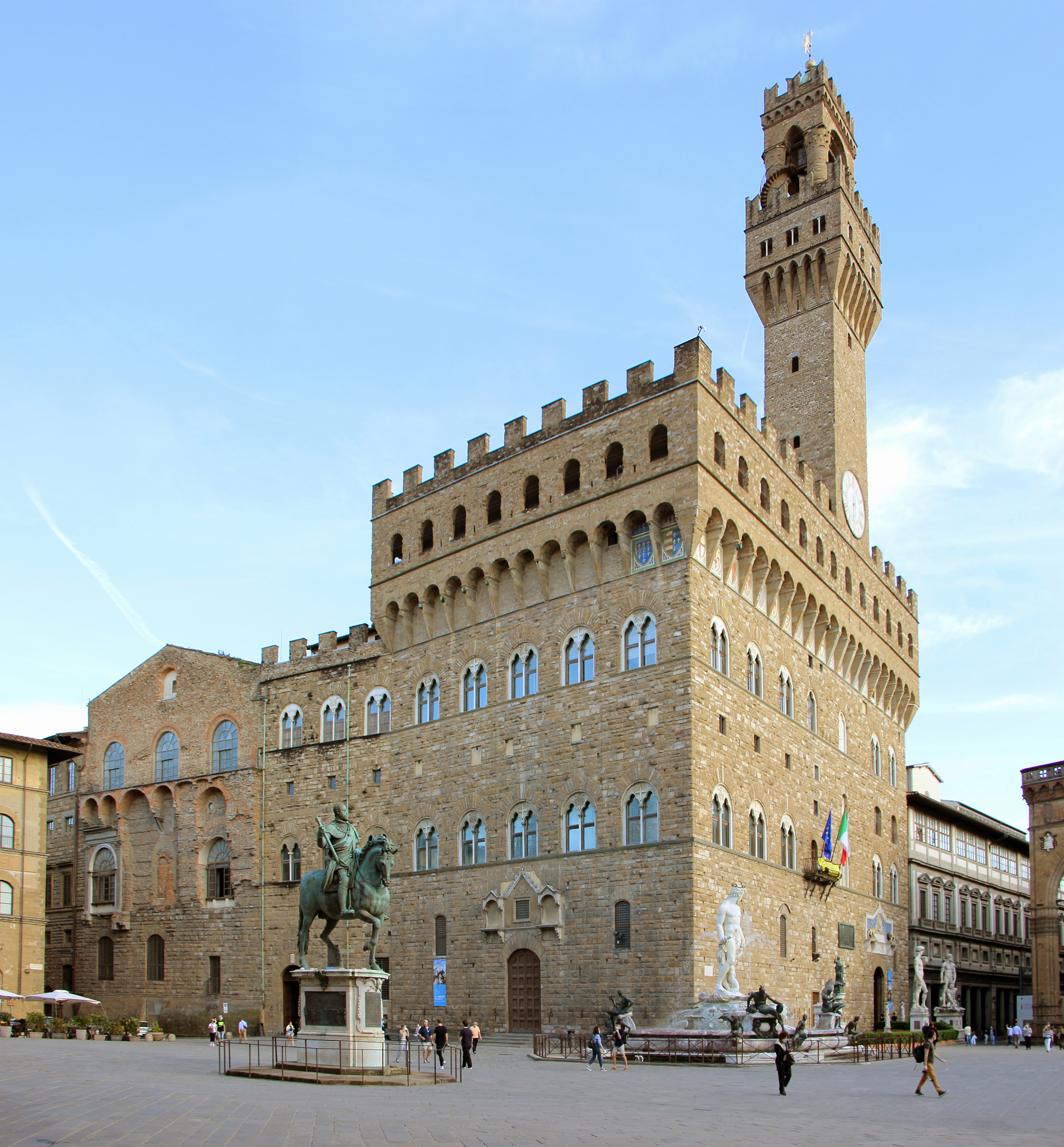
Palazzo della Signoria or Palazzo Vecchio, symbol of the power of the feudal lordship of Florence and of the Republic of Florence.

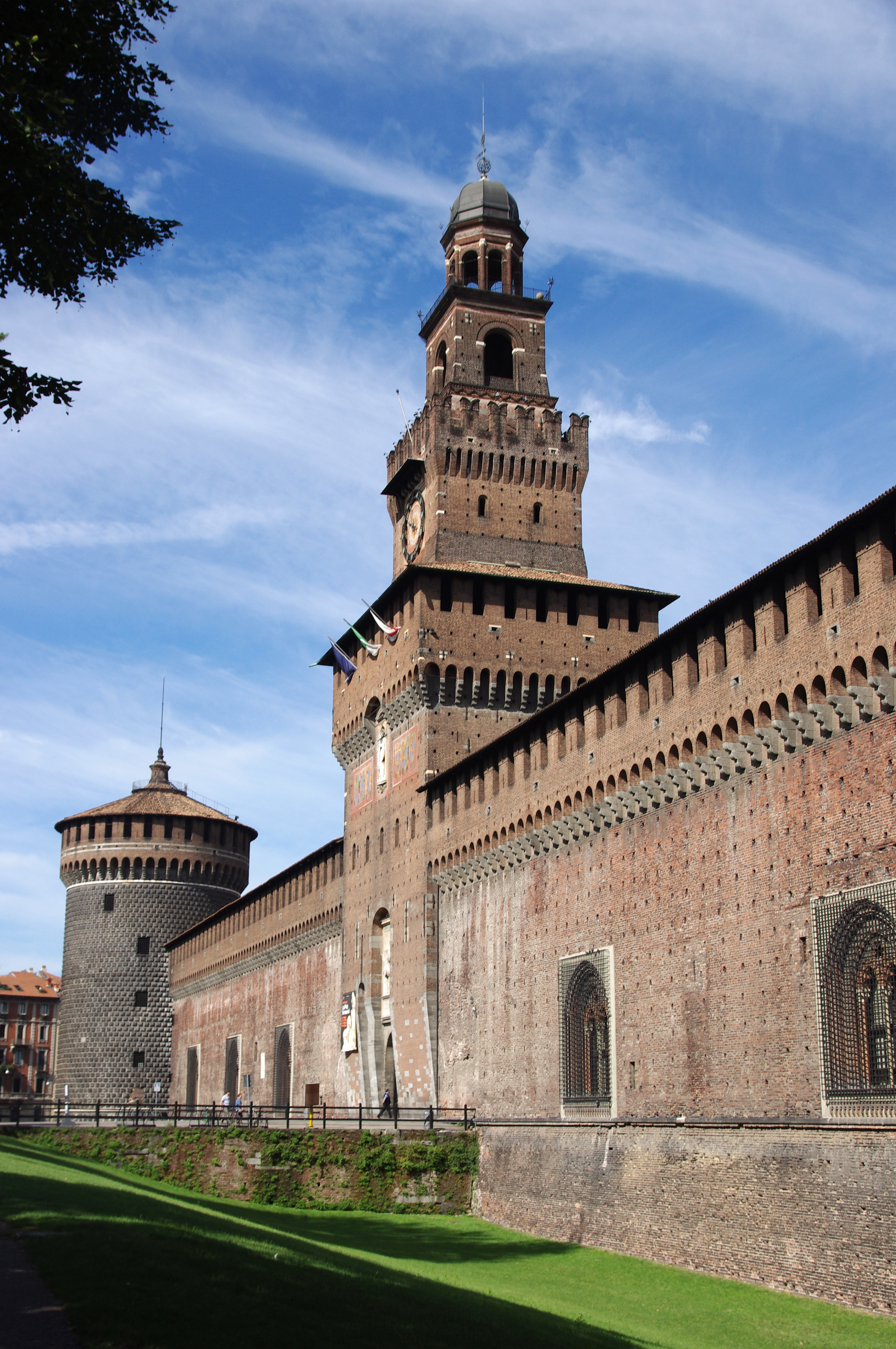
Sforza Castle, symbol of the political and military power of the House of Sforza, heirs of the House of Visconti, Dukes of Milan.

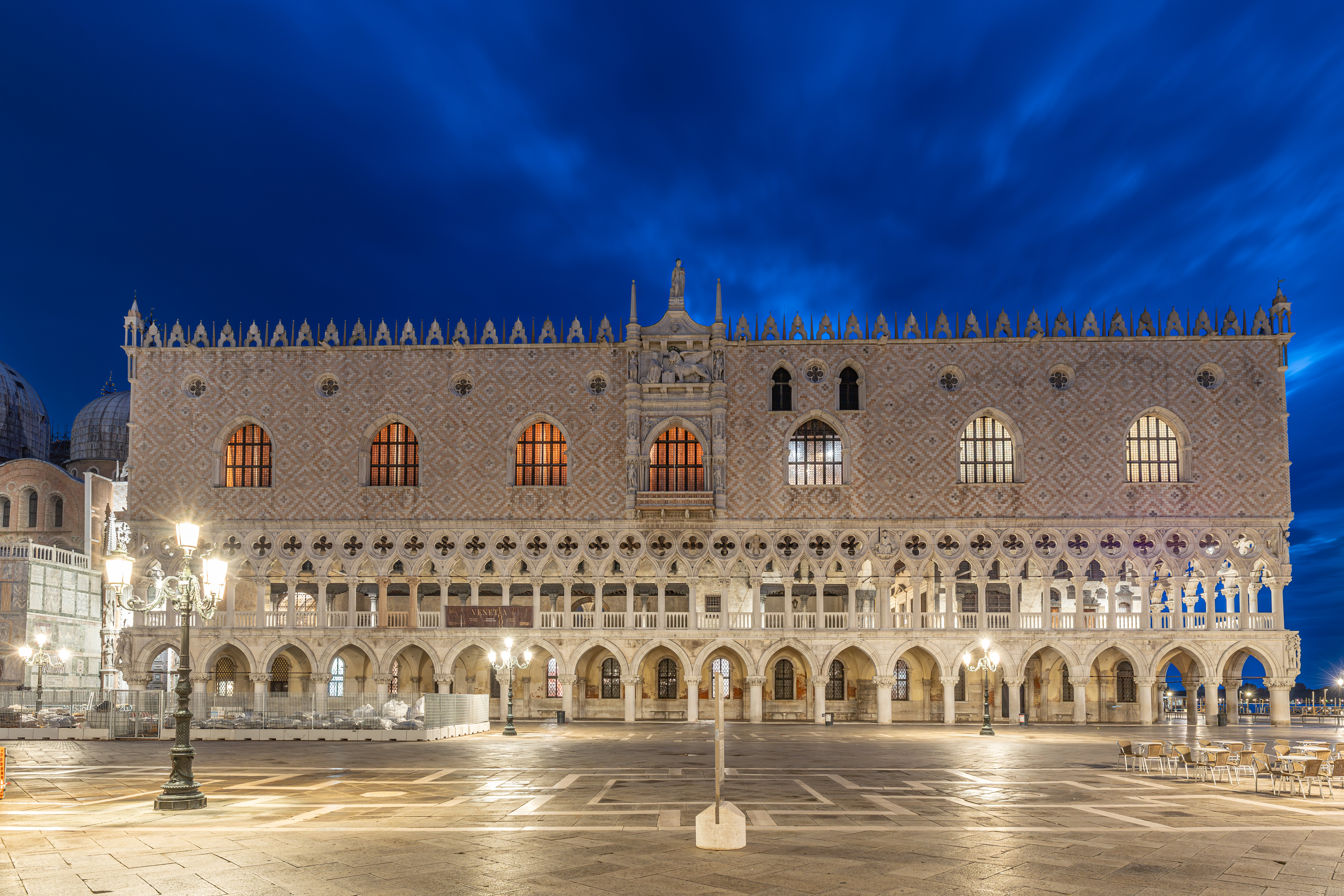
Doge's Palace, Venice

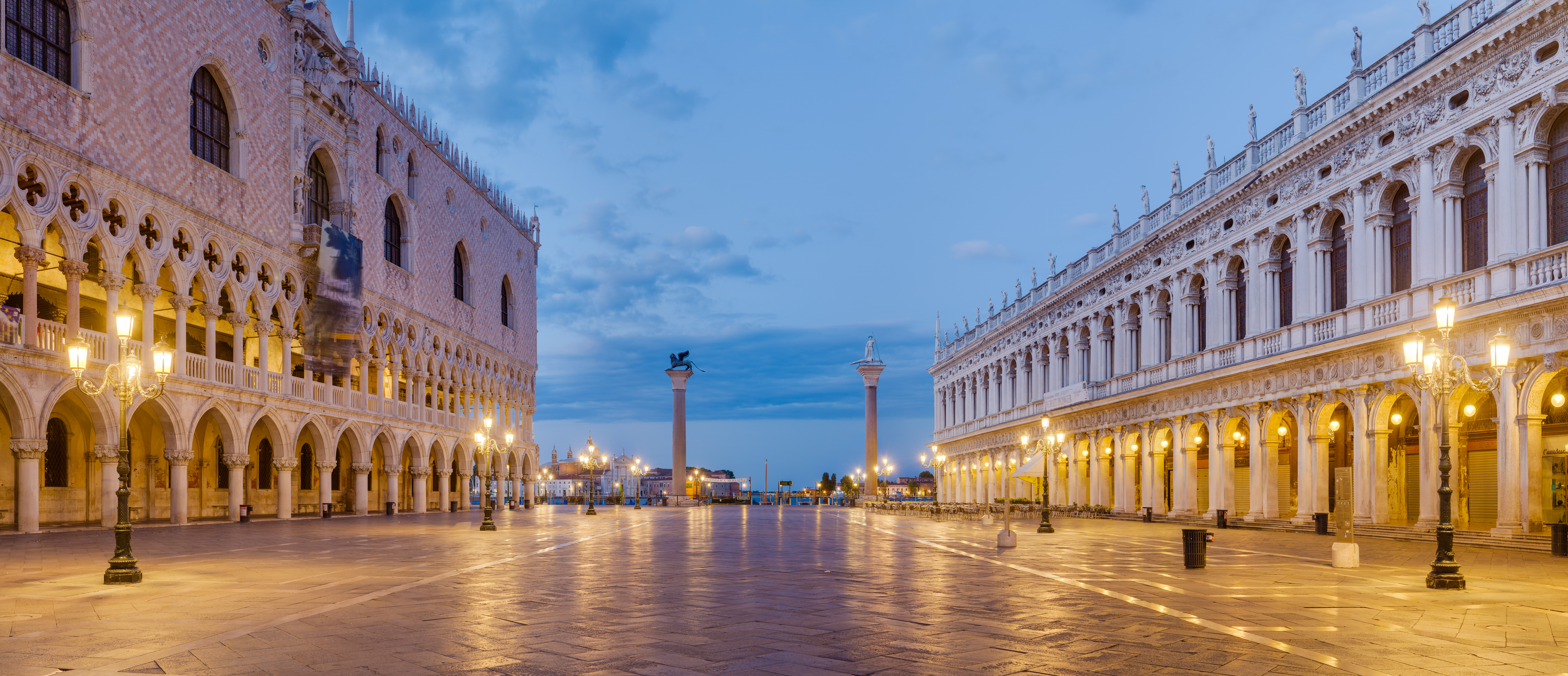
View of Piazzetta San Marco toward Grand Canal of Venice, at dawn, with Doge's Palace on the left and Biblioteca Marciana on the right. The two columns are, from left to right, Saint Mark's, protector of the city, and Saint Theodore's.

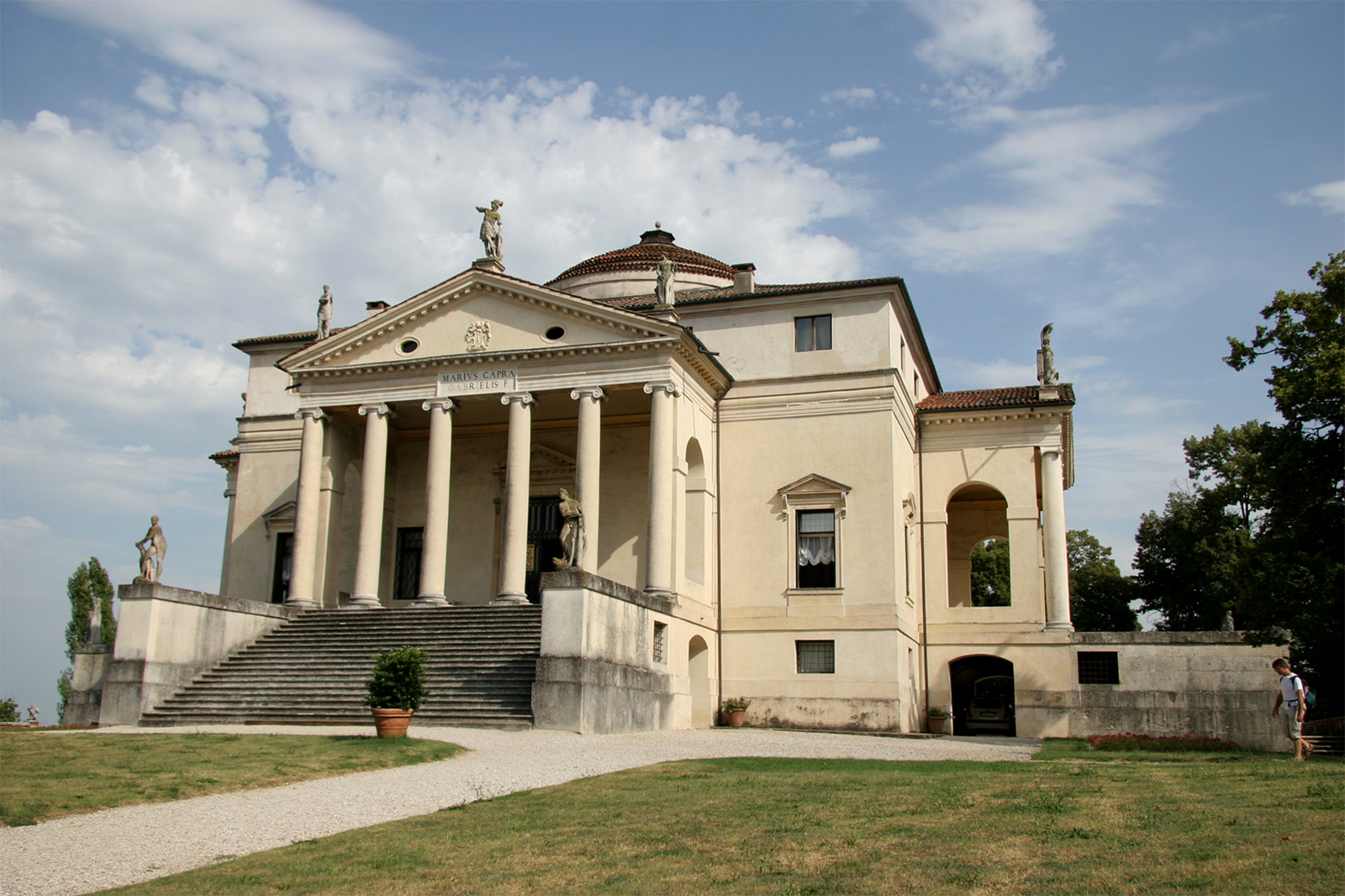
Villa La Rotonda in Vicenza. One of Palladio's most influential designs.

The transition from the Late Middle Ages to the Italian Renaissance saw the affirmation of the Maritime Republics of Genoa and Venice, the Republic of Florence, the Papal States with Rome, the Duchy of Savoy, and the Duchy of Milan and other minor states, while in the South of the peninsula the Kingdom of Naples, the Kingdom of Sicily and the Kingdom of Sardinia were established. These states governed by the noble families, or that became noble, often at war and in conflict with each other or with matrimonial alliances, try to expand their power and territories, in the affirmation of their dominion, built palaces, churches and villas and were often patrons of artists such as painters, sculptors and architects. This historical, artistic and architectural movement is called the Italian Renaissance. Renaissance, understood as rebirth, return to life, after the period of the Black Death that occurred in Europe from 1346 to 1353. The House of Medici in Florence contributed significantly to the development of the Italian Renaissance, and in particular with Lorenzo de' Medici, who became the most powerful patron of Renaissance culture in Italy and for this reason was called Lorenzo Il Magnifico. Lorenzo de' Medici brought together the greatest artists and architects of his time, among whom Leonardo da Vinci stands out, one of the greatest geniuses polymath of humanity, who initially worked in Florence but then spent much time in the service of Ludovico Sforza in Milan. The House of Sforza, heirs of the Visconti, made a very important contribution to the development of the Italian Renaissance in the Duchy of Milan. Furthermore, the Papal States emerged as the dominant state in Italian Renaissance. The Renaissance popes, such as Julius II and Leo X, were patrons of great architects and artists, such as Donato Bramante and Raffaello Sanzio da Urbino, Michelangelo Buonarroti. During this period, Rome experienced a significant increase in construction and edifices: palaces, churches, and other medieval structures were enlarged and expanded, and new buildings were constructed by Roman noble families and the cardinals' court. Rome returned, albeit in a different form, almost to the architectural splendor of the Imperial era. Unfortunately, as in the Middle Ages, and even more so during the Renaissance, some Roman archaeological finds were plundered as valuable building materials for Renaissance palaces and churches. Among the thousands of architectural and artistic works under construction or expansion, the reconstruction of St. Peter's Basilica and Michelangelo's frescoes in the Sistine Chapel stand out above all others. Unfortunately, as had happened in the classical age of ancient Rome, in Imperial Rome with the barbarian invasions and the sack of Rome, also during the Renaissance the wealth of the Papal States attracted Imperial attention. In 1527, Holy Roman Emperor Charles V of Habsburg sent his imperial troops, including the Landsknechts, to sack of Rome again. The Sack of Rome caused severe damage to the city's artistic heritage. Work on St. Peter's Basilica was also interrupted, only resuming in 1534 under the pontificate of Paul III. Roman citizens were plundered and massacred; 20,000 were killed, 10,000 fled, and 30,000 subsequently died from the plague brought by the Landsknechts. Pope Clement VII, who had taken refuge in Castel Sant'Angelo while much of the Swiss Guard was massacred, was forced to pay 400,000 ducats for his safety and freedom. The interrupted work was resumed only many years later, when the population had recovered and grown again. Michelangelo returned to Rome in 1534 to complete the frescoes in the Sistine Chapel. The Renaissance in Rome came to an abrupt halt, but it did not stop, and regained strength in the following decades. Meanwhile, in other cities of the Italian peninsula, it grew and developed. During the Renaissance, the two maritime republics of Genoa and Venice reached the height of their influence and economic and political power in the Mediterranean. They enjoyed great mercantile wealth, which they invested in the expansion and enhancement of medieval palaces and churches and in the new constructions of Renaissance architecture and art. The Doge's palaces, built in the Middle Ages, were enriched and embellished according to Renaissance principles. The noble merchant families also embellished the old medieval palaces and built new ones. Venice achieved a significant level of beauty and urban expansion, which, due to its unique lagoon city structure, remained almost unchanged for the following centuries. The Venetian Renaissance architectural style makes Venice a jewel on the Adriatic Sea, but its dominions in Italy also exploit its unique style, as well as, beyond the Italian peninsula, its dominions in the eastern Mediterranean. In the Veneto, among the domains of Venice, we find the works, villas and residences of the greatest architect of the Venetian Renaissance, Andrea Palladio, whose Palladian architectural style had an enormous influence on Neoclassical architecture even centuries later. In some ways, he was the precursor of the Neoclassical architecture that would come into being in the 18th and 19th centuries. The city of Vicenza, with its 23 buildings designed by Palladio, and his 24 villas in the Veneto are listed by UNESCO as part of a World Heritage Site named City of Vicenza and the Palladian Villas of the Veneto. The churches of Palladio are to be found within the "Venice and its Lagoon" UNESCO World Heritage Site.

=== Baroque ===
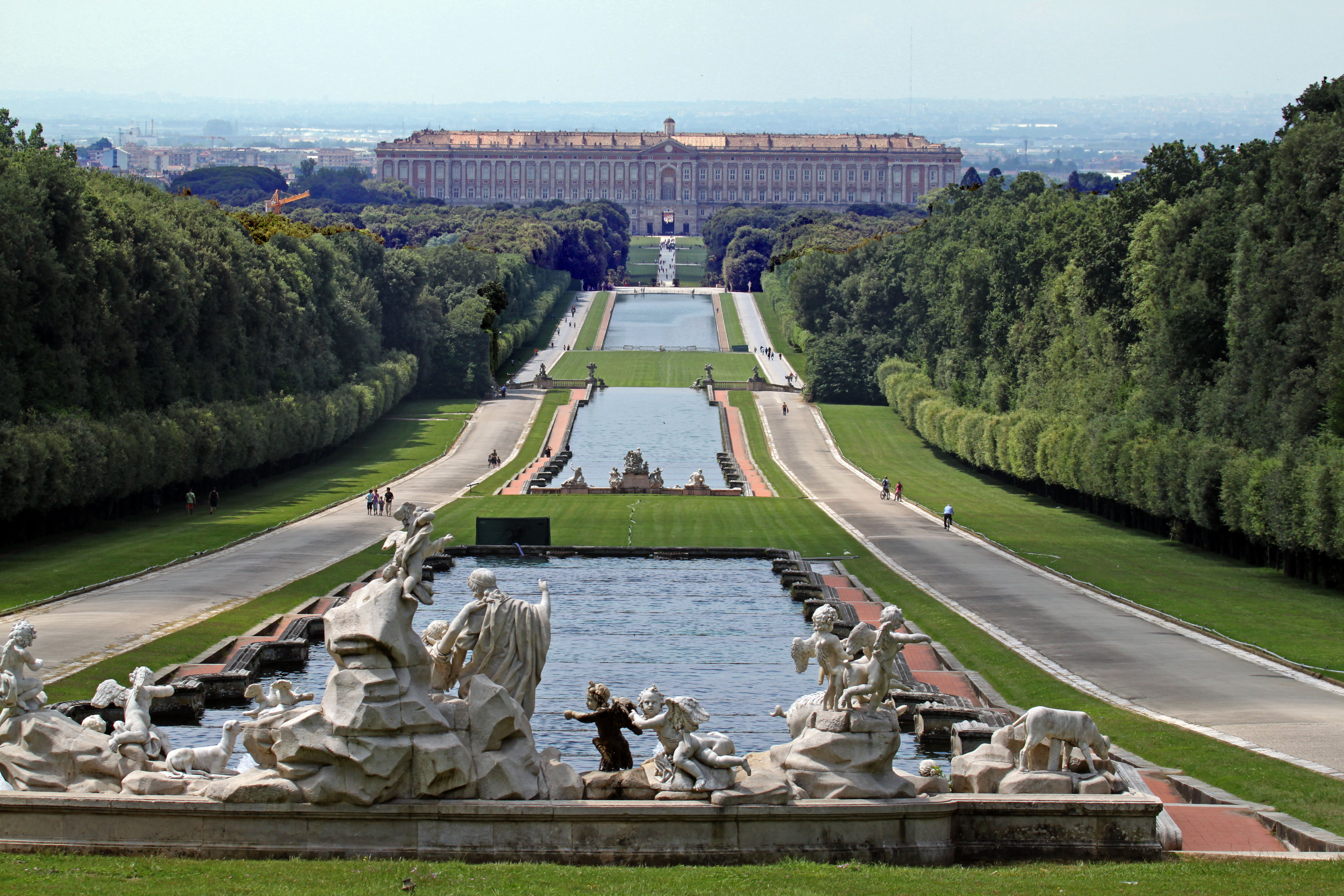
Royal Palace of Caserta

=== Neo-Renaissance ===
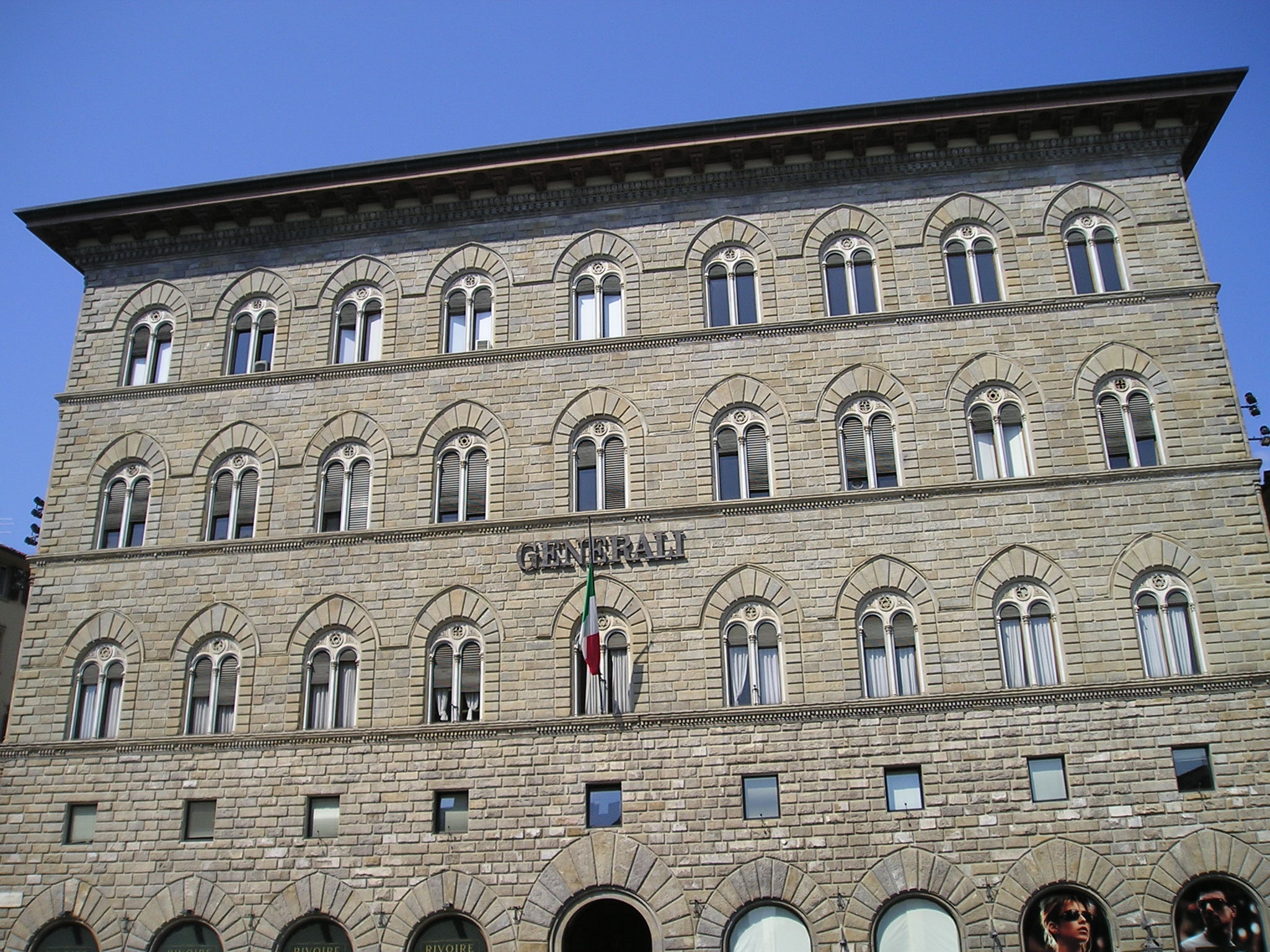
Palazzo delle Assicurazioni Generali in Florence, Italy

=== Modern ===
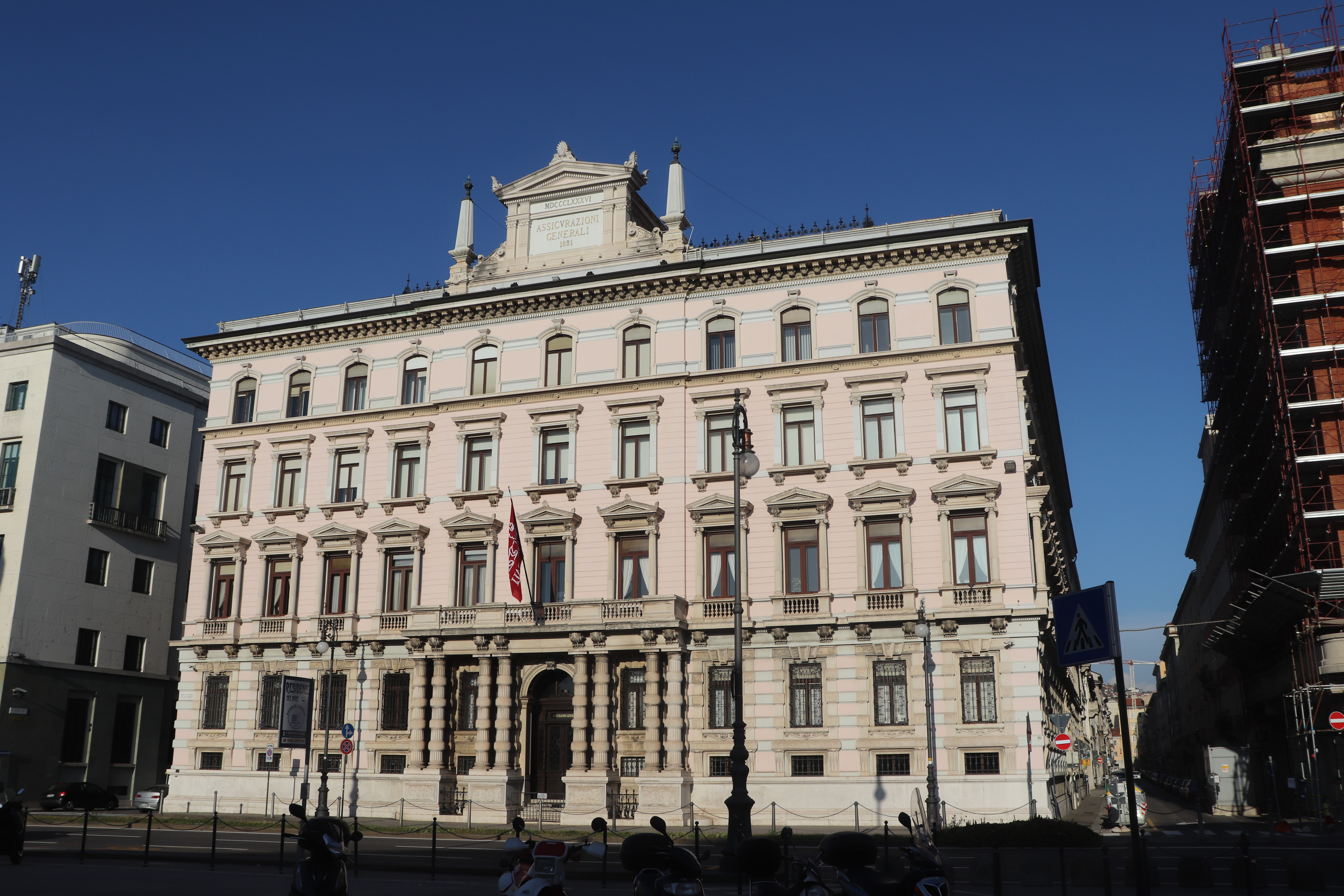
Palazzo Generali in Trieste

=== Contemporary ===
Bosco Verticale in Milan

Intesa Sanpaolo Skyscraper in Turin designed by Renzo Piano

In 2024, the enhancement of the Italian real estate heritage originates from the new relationship or balance that contemporary man must have with the environment and the territory, not a land to occupy but a place to regenerate, new buildings like those in modern use must be eco-sustainable and energy efficient, according to the European parameters and constraints of energy efficiency foreseen by the European Green Deal. Furthermore, there is a different sensitivity towards places and landscape in compliance with Italian laws on landscape constraints. The Italian state, through local institutions, supported urban regeneration and land redevelopment projects, demolishing abusive or degraded buildings. In Italy, after the COVID-19 pandemic, the illegal building is no longer regularized, currently illegal construction is demolished to protect the environment and places.
In 2024, the environment and the territory in Italy are seen as integral part of the health and well-being of the community, of the inhabitants and even the urban territory is understood in this sense, as part of the health and well-being of citizens. Among the many urban redevelopment projects in Italy that fully embody this new search for balance between man and environment, there is the Bosco Verticale built in the city of Milan, which is not only a complex urban reforestation project, but also proposes itself as a new architectural concept. A concept that has a historical precursor in the Torre Guinigi in Lucca. While in Turin the Intesa Sanpaolo Skyscraper designed by Renzo Piano was built, a clear example of Contemporary architecture, a bioclimatic and energy efficient building. Furthermore, Renzo Piano is the architect of the most important urban and marine redevelopment project in Italy with the renovation of the marine and exhibition area of Genoa called Waterfront di Levante.

=== Neo-futurism ===
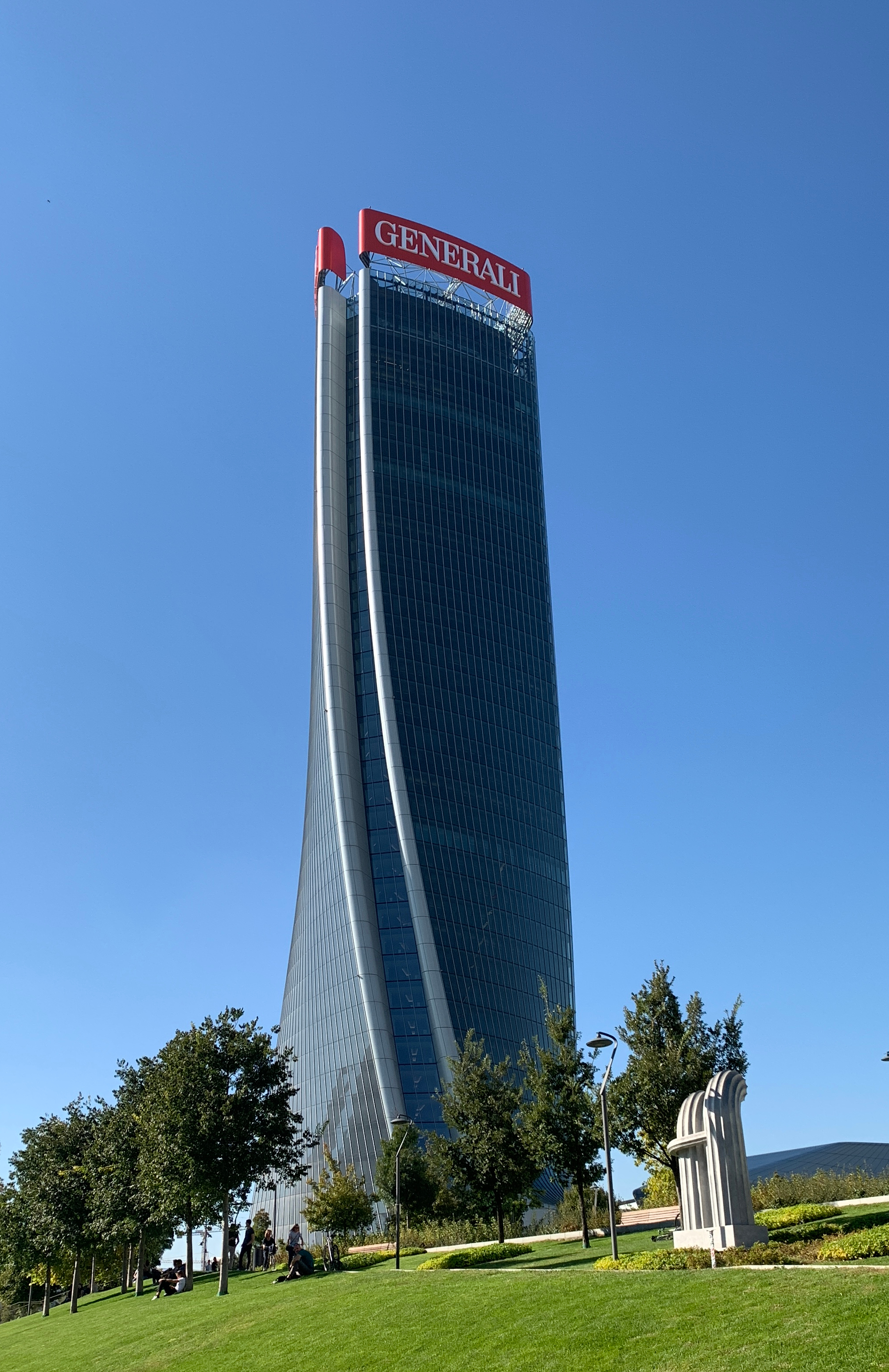
Generali Tower in Milan

The city of Milan presents numerous projects of urban regeneration and construction of new skyscrapers in Neo-futurist architectural style. A clear example is the CityLife project.

=== Renewal ===
Renewal is the current architectural style such as Neo-futuristic but strongly oriented towards integration into the environment, where the newly constructed building is inserted into a context of urban redevelopment and reforestation and landscape protection. While the existing Italian real estate heritage is maintained, restored and preserved, in harmony with the environment and therefore revalued. The environment, through its protection, plays a fundamental role in the health and well-being of the community, its inhabitants and citizens. Among the many projects completed and underway, there is for example the new Bocconi Urban Campus in Milan created by the Japanese studio SANAA by architects Kazuyo Sejima and Ryue Nishizawa. However, the project, which draws inspiration from the internal courtyards of Milanese palaces, partly captures the stylistic concept of the Italian Renewal, understood as a renewed balance between man and nature, as although the buildings present Neo-futuristic architectural elements, it harks back to minimalism of Japanese architecture.

== From the 18th Century to the Post-War Era ==
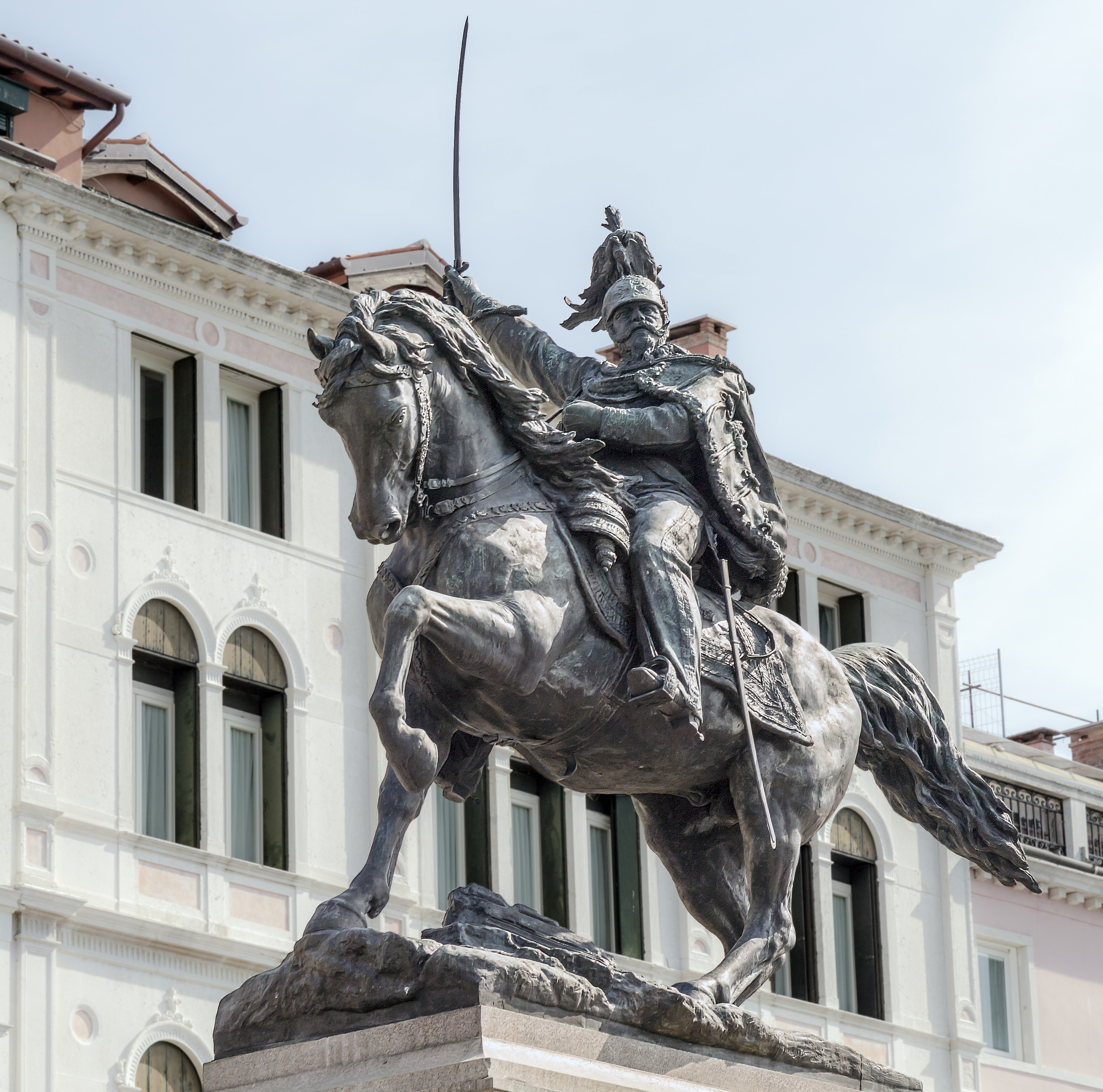
Monument to Victor Emmanuel II (Venice)

=== From the 18th Century to the Early 19th Century ===
Italy as a modern country began in 1861, but it was not until the late 19th century that the king began to gain power. As the king's power increased, the planning of the country, especially the construction of the capital Rome, became a new theme. A major change in urban planning and real estate in Italy occurred in the mid-eighteenth century.

In 1911, Victor Emmanuel III inaugurated and was called II Vittoriano. The erection of the II Vittoriano was accompanied by a major change in the city planning of Rome in the 18th century, establishing urban architecture full of Italian art nouveau and Greek and Roman classicism. In the early 19th century that urban planners built low-cost, functional housing with cheap materials and no decoration in the marginal areas of Rome. Therefore, in the early years of industrialization of the 20th century, many Italian workers and immigrants lived in one- or two-bedroom houses, located among the ghettoes near factories.

=== The Post-War Reconstruction ===
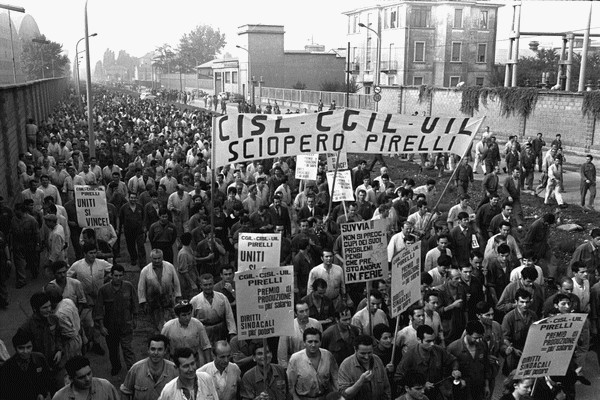
Pirelli workers on strike, Milan 1969

During World War II, many buildings in Italy were destroyed, and in 1945, the housing crisis became a prominent social theme.Then, the concept of owning one's own house emerged among Italians.During the post-war reconstruction period, Italian designers and architects began to build houses combining the spiritual and physical needs of the working class for the first time.

At that time, people combined the construction of new housing with the ideology of destroying fascist rule and promoting democracy. Many young architects combine the traditional Italian housing design with the use of new materials and modern needs in their design. During this period, the decoration and furnishing of the house also showed a combination of traditional Italian style and modern rationalism.

In the 1950s, urban housing in Italy was still in short supply, and most working-class families lived in small apartments on the outskirts of industrial towns. During the period of 1950-1970, a series of construction projects built houses for working-class people in urban areas, but the construction standards were still low.Poor construction quality and low supply led to the strikes of the "hot autumn" in 1969. The protest has promoted the development and reformation of Italy’s social and welfare housing system.

== From the 1970s to the Post-Pandemic Era ==
=== Price dynamics and cycles ===
Regarding the development of the real estate market in modern times, Casolaro and Fabrizi claim that it consists of five cycles. The peaks of house prices appeared in 1975, 1981, 1992, and 2007. Among the peaks, there are cycles of house prices, and from 1970 to 2016, the house prices of Italy more than doubled.

By analyzing the cycles, Casolaro and Fabrizi conclude that in these five cycles, the peaks of house prices rose successively, and each peak was about 23% higher than the previous peak. From 2000 to 2006, the real estate market in Italy experienced an expansion period, and the price and trading volumes reached a peak. Then, the market is characterized by a steady decline from 2007.

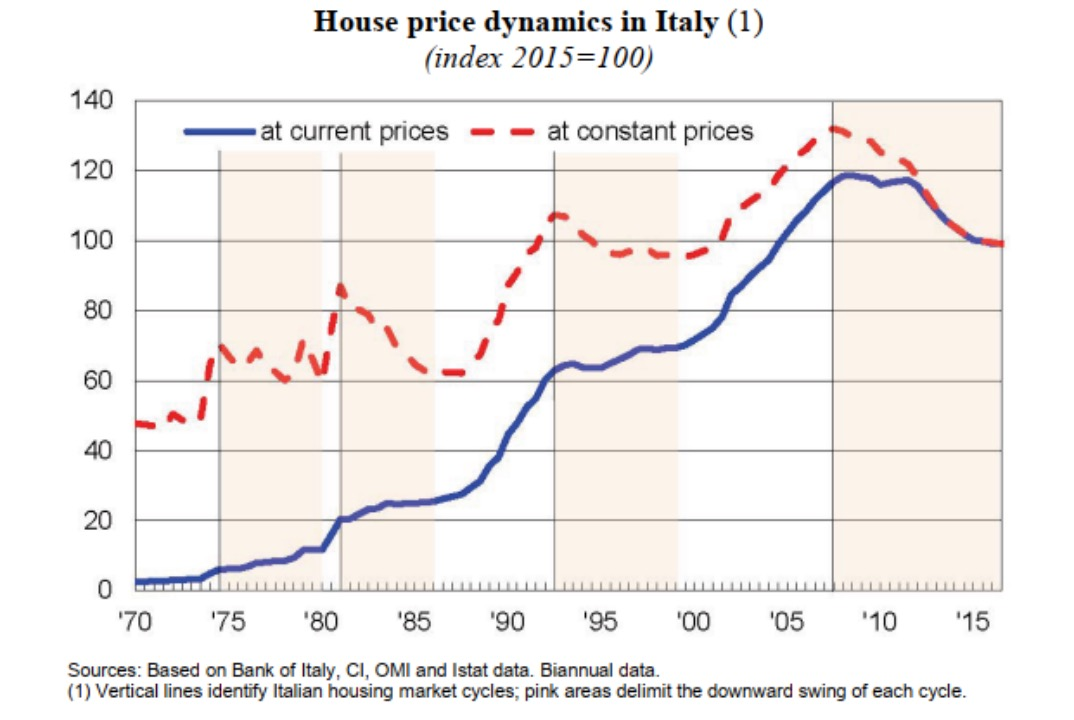
House price dynamics in Italy Casolaro Fabrizi.png

=== Financial stability and 2008 financial crisis ===
In the 1990s and 2000s, systemic economic crises caused by overheated real estate markets occurred in many countries such as Sweden, the United Kingdom, Denmark, and the United States. Such an economic crisis stemming from real estate never occurred in Italy.

Although a systemic economic crisis caused by real estate has not occurred in Italy, the Italian real estate market has had an impact on economic stability in some periods. From 1993–1997, real estate prices experienced a sharp drop, which led to the deterioration of credit quality in the banking system.

From 2007 to 2015, the real estate market in Italy experienced a fall in sales and accumulation of unsold properties. During this period, although the total loans in Italy decreased, the non-performing loans increased by about €90 billion. Then, real estate firms did not have the ability to pay off the high debt because their revenues had decreased. This had a negative impact on the financial stability of Italy.

Through various analytical methods, some scholars have concluded that, compared with the United States, the Italian real estate market is more stable and less prone to drastic price fluctuations.

Using an analytical framework of a set of indicators and three complementary early warning models, Ciocchetta et al. (2016, p. 5) get the result that, although the banking vulnerability in the real estate sector remains high in 2015 and 2016, the crisis will decline and the risks in the real estate sector are low.

By comparing the house price index in Italy and the United States, Caliman claims that during the expansion phase from 2000 to 2003, the house price in Italy increased substantially but not exceptionally. Caliman (2009, p. 421) claims that compared to the United States, the housing market in Italy is more stable and less likely to lead to a financial crisis.

Despite the conclusion that the Italian real estate market is relatively stable and unlikely to lead to a financial crisis, the 2008 financial crisis had an impact on the Italian real estate market.

According to Baldini and Poggio, the 2008 financial crisis led to the reduction of market transactions, new residential building activities, and the number of new mortgages.

Baldini and Poggio also argue that the traditional family-based view of housing ownership can provide some protection to the real estate market in a global financial crisis. Another view on the stability of Italian real estate is that the situation is region-dependent. Palma’s (et al., 2019, p. 580) research concluded that the real estate market in regions with lower population density is more resilient to the effects of a recession than those with higher population density.

=== Impact of Covid-19 ===
De Toro et al. conducted surveys in the metropolitan area of Naples in Italy to assess the impact of the COVID-19 pandemic on the real estate market.

They find that, firstly, transactions in the real estate market decreased in the first quarter of 2020, due to financial instability and uncertainty.

More importantly, they found a structural change in the demand for housing caused by the pandemic.

According to their survey results, the pandemic and lockdown revealed the importance of common spaces of housing to families, with about 30% of the respondents saying that they want a larger home with open spaces, natural lighting, and spaces for leisure activities.

Guglielminetti et al. (2021) presented similar conclusions. By analyzing secondary data related to real estate in Italy during the pandemic, Guglielminetti et al. (2021, p. 5) found that the COVID-19 pandemic made people prefer larger houses located in low-density areas, suitable for single families, and with outdoor space.

=== Trends After Covid-19 ===
The real estate market in Italy is experiencing a recovery after COVID-19. Due to the impact of COVID-19, the number of real estate transactions in Italy fell in 2020, but continued to rise in 2021 and 2022.

In 2023, the residential property sales declined by 10% compared to 2022, while the purchase of second homes, especially for investment, increased by 1.5% compared to 2022.

Contrary to the trends of people’s preference for larger houses presented during COVID-19, compared to 2022, the sales of one-bedroom apartments increased 64% .

This is not because families prefer small houses during this period, but because buyers intend to invest and rent out one-bedroom apartments to earn rental income. Pinto (2022) states that the rise in one-bedroom apartment sales can also be due to the fast recovery of tourism in Italy.

International MLS Forum (2024) claimed that it indicates that people still consider real estate as a reliable investment option.

Another trend of the housing demand in the post-pandemic era is that Italians prefer larger homes with outdoor private space. Morano et al. (2024, p. 1681) conducted surveys and analyzed the sales data during the post-pandemic era in six Italian cities. They found that the demand for housing is shifting to larger homes with private outdoor space, located in the city's peripheral areas, and designed with a clear division between functional and living space.

== See also ==
- Geography of Italy
- Italian architecture
- Self-managed social centres in Italy
