= Customs racketeering =

Customs racketeering is the act of customs agents seizing cargo on ships for their own gain by claiming that they have the legal right to do so. This can be done by aggressively enforcing obscure or old regulations, altering the severity of enforcement of other laws, or charging exorbitant fees to have goods clear customs. Customs racketeering was a big problem mainly during the pre- and post- American Revolutionary years, which caused numerous conflicts between the United States and Great Britain.

== See also ==
- Sugar Act
- Search and seizure
- Confiscation
