= Confiscation =

Legal form of seizure by a public authority

Confiscation (from the Latin confiscatio "to consign to the fiscus, i.e. transfer to the treasury") is a legal form of seizure by a government or other public authority. The word is also used, popularly, of spoliation under legal forms, or of any seizure of property as punishment or in enforcement of the law.

== Scope ==
As a punishment, it differs from a fine in that it is not primarily meant to match the crime but rather reattributes the criminal's ill-gotten spoils (often as a complement to the actual punishment for the crime itself; still common with various kinds of contraband, such as protected living organisms) to the community or even aims to rob them of their socio-economic status, in the extreme case reducing them to utter poverty, or if he or she is condemned to death even denies them the power to bequeath inheritance to their legal heirs.

Meanwhile, limited confiscation is often in function of the crime, the rationale being that the criminal must be denied the fruits of their fault, while the crime itself is rather punished in some other, independent way, such as prison term, physical punishments or even a concurring fine.

Often, police will auction items confiscated via police auction or asset forfeiture and keep the proceeds. Theoretically, it is possible for owners to buy back confiscated items.

In airports, potentially dangerous items (such as hazardous chemicals, weapons, and sharp objects) are usually confiscated at inspections. Other items, such as certain food, may also be confiscated, depending on importation laws. Depending on the nature of the items, some may be returned at the end of the flight, while most are discarded or auctioned off. The musical comedian Anna Russell had an Irish harp confiscated by the U.S. Customs Service.

== History ==
=== Roman Law ===
Originally, in Roman law, confiscation was the seizure and transfer of private property to the fiscus (treasury) by the emperor; hence the appropriation, under legal authority, of private property to the state.

=== English Law ===
In modern English law, confiscation embraces forfeiture in the case of goods, and escheat in the case of lands, for crime or in default of heirs (see also Eminent domain). Goods may also be confiscated by the state for breaches of statutes relating to customs, excise or explosives. In the United Kingdom a confiscation order is a court order made under part 2 (England & Wales), part 3 (Scotland) or part 4 (Northern Ireland) of the Proceeds of Crime Act 2002 requiring a convicted defendant to pay a specified sum of money to the state by a specified date.

=== United States ===
During the American Revolution, customs racketeering became a serious problem. By harshly enforcing customs laws, particularly the more obscure regulations, corrupt customs officials could seize property almost with impunity. This caused significant conflict between the United States and Great Britain.

In the United States among the "war measures" during the American Civil War, acts were passed in 1861 and 1862 confiscating, respectively, property used for "insurrectionary purposes" and the property generally of those engaged in rebellion.

== Modern trends ==
There was from the late 1980s onwards a resurgence of interest in confiscation as crime prevention tool, which went hand in hand with the interest in the criminalization of money laundering. A number of international instruments, starting with the 1988 Vienna Convention, have strongly suggested the enactment of legal provisions enabling confiscation of proceeds of crime. The 40 recommendations of the Financial Action Task Force (FATF) have also stated its importance as a crime prevention tool.

A further trend has been the reversal of the burden of proof for the purpose of facilitating confiscation. To the surprise of many, it is actually quite legal for law enforcement agencies to take property from people who haven't been convicted of a crime yet as civil asset forfeiture, a practice which brings in millions of dollars of revenue each year, disproportionately affecting people without means or access to a lawyer.

== See also ==
- Civil forfeiture in the United States
- Government auction
- Individual reclamation
- New Zealand land confiscations
- Prodrazvyorstka (1918–1921) under War Communism in Soviet Russia
- Sentence (law)
- Sequestration (law)
- Spanish confiscation
