= Fortezza Medicea =

Fortezza Medicea may refer to one of several fortresses built by the House of Medici in Italy:

- Fortezza Medicea (Arezzo), 1538
- Fortezza di Girifalco in Cortona, 1556
- Bastione Fortezza in Grosseto, 1565
- Fortezza Medicea di San Martino in San Piero a Sieve, 1569
- Fortezza Medicea (Siena), 1561
- Castello di Piombino, 1552
- Fortezza Medicea di Poggio Imperiale in Poggibonsi, 1488
- Fortezza Medicea (Volterra), 1475
  - which includes the Fortezza Medicea restaurant
