= Palazzo Clemente della Rovere =

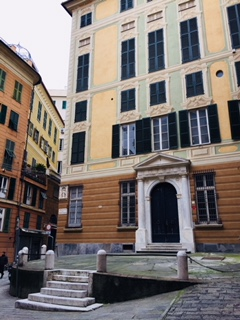
- Interactive map of the Palazzo Clemente della Rovere area

General information
- Status: In use
- Type: Palace
- Architectural style: Mannerist
- Location: Genoa, Piazza Rovere, 1, Genoa, Italy
- Coordinates: 44.4102789°N 8.9355567°E
- Groundbreaking: 1580
- Landlord: Clemente della Rovere

UNESCO World Heritage Site
- Part of: Genoa: Le Strade Nuove and the system of the Palazzi dei Rolli
- Criteria: Cultural: (ii)(iv)
- Reference: 1211
- Inscription: 2006 (30th Session)

The Palazzo Clemente della Rovere is a palace located in Piazza Rovere in the historical center of Genoa, Northwestern Italy. The palace was one of the 163 Palazzi dei Rolli of Genoa, the selected private residences where the notable guests of the Republic of Genoa were hosted during State visits. On 13 July 2006 it was added to the list of 42 palaces which now form the UNESCO World Heritage Site Genoa: Le Strade Nuove and the system of the Palazzi dei Rolli. The palace hosts today the General Consulate of Iceland.

== The Rolli of Genoa ==
The Rolli di Genova – or, more precisely, the Rolli degli alloggiamenti pubblici di Genova (Italian for "Lists of the public lodgings of Genoa") were the official lists at the time of the Republic of Genoa of the private palaces and mansions, belonging to the most distinguished Genoese families, which – if chosen through a public lottery – were obliged to host on behalf of the Government the most notable visitors during their State visit to the Republic. Later, these palaces hosted many famous visitors to Genoa during their Grand Tour, a cultural itinerary around Italy

== History ==
The palace was commissioned in 1580 by Clemente della Rovere, a Genoese aristocrat from the distinguished Della Rovere family, which counted among its members two Popes (Sixtus IV and Julius II), the Duke of Urbino Francesco Maria I and the Genoese Doge Francesco Maria della Rovere. In the arts, the family reached the peak of their influence in the 15th century, when Pope Sixtus IV della Rovere commissioned the Sistine Chapel, and in the 16th century, when Pope Julius II della Rovere became known for his patronage of artists. In Genoa, the Doge Francesco Maria della Rovere was a fine collector of crystals, pottery and paintings, which he brought to the palace, where he retired after completing his term at the head of the Genoese Government.

The palace was built in an area between via San Sebastiano and Salita Santa Caterina, which is now in the center of the city but at the time was close to the 16th century walls and to religious buildings, where monks and nuns sought peace and tranquility. The construction of the palace proceeded at a fast pace and was completed in 1581, within two years from the start of the works. The palace was built as two separate wings, with one – the San Sebastiano wing – smaller and not in line with the main wing. This structure is still visible today, as the Palace has not undergone any major renovation since Rubens depicted it in the 17th century. On the right hand side of the Palace, there is a 17th-century statue of Our Lady of Mercy.

In the 19th century the palace passed to the Piccardo family. It currently hosts the Consulate of Iceland.

== Bibliography ==
- Gioconda Pomella (2007), Guida Completa ai Palazzi dei Rolli Genova. Genova: De Ferrari Editore (ISBN 9788871728155)
- Mauro Quercioli (2008), I Palazzi dei Rolli di Genova. Roma: Libreria dello Stato (ISBN 9788824011433)
- Fiorella Caraceni Poleggi (2001), Palazzi Antichi e Moderni di Genova raccolti e disegnati da Pietro Paolo Rubens (1652), Genova, Tormena Editore (ISBN 9788884801302)
- Mario Labò (2003), I palazzi di Genova di P.P. Rubens. Genova, Nuova Editrice Genovese
- Ennio Poleggi (1968), Strada Nuova: una lottizzazione del Cinquecento a Genova. Genova: SAGEP Editrice.
- Ennio Poleggi (2008), Genova Le Strade Nuove e il sistema dei Palazzi dei Rolli. Genova: SAGEP Editrice (ISBN 9788870589962).

== Gallery ==
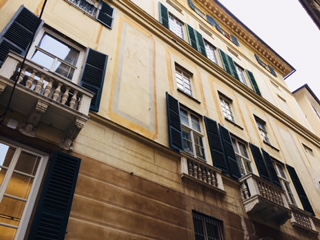
Palazzo Clemente Della Rovere

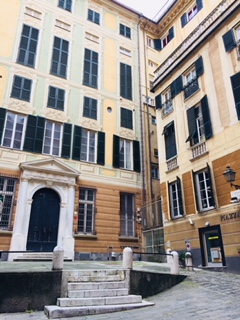
Palazzo Clemente Della Rovere

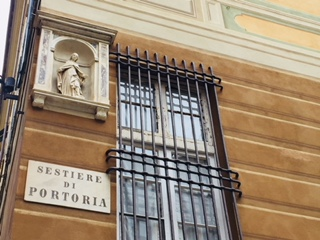
Palazzo Clemente Della Rovere Genova, Our Lady of Mercy

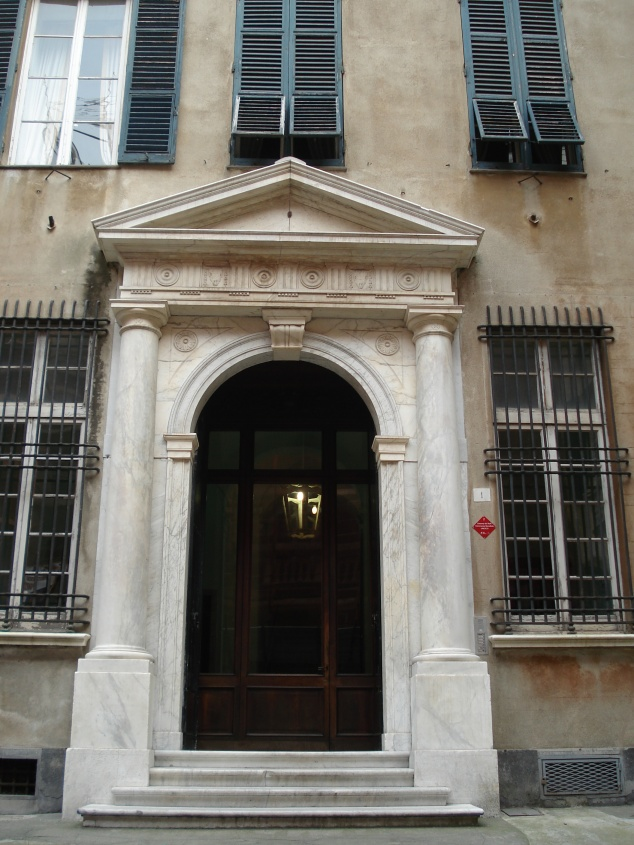
Palazzo Clemente Della Rovere Genoa, Portal

== See also ==
- List of World Heritage Sites in Italy
- Della Rovere
