= List of World Heritage Sites in Italy =

Location of World Heritage Sites in Italy. The green dots indicate the Pile dwelling settlements (19 locations), pink dots indicate the Ancient beech forests (13 locations), orange dots indicate the Evaporitic Karsts (nine locations), blue dots indicate the Domus de janas sites (18 locations), and grey dots indicate the condominio theatres in Central Italy (10 locations).

The United Nations Educational, Scientific and Cultural Organization (UNESCO) World Heritage Sites are places of importance to cultural or natural heritage as described in the UNESCO World Heritage Convention, established in 1972. Cultural heritage consists of monuments (such as architectural works, monumental sculptures, or inscriptions), groups of buildings, and sites (including archaeological sites). Natural features (consisting of physical and biological formations), geological and physiographical formations (including habitats of threatened species of animals and plants), and natural sites which are important from the point of view of science, conservation or natural beauty, are defined as natural heritage. Italy ratified the convention on June 23, 1978.

Italy has 62 listed sites, making it the state party with the most World Heritage Sites, just above China (61) and France (56). The first site in Italy, the Rock Drawings in Valcamonica, was listed at the 3rd Session of the World Heritage Committee, held in Cairo and Luxor, Egypt, in 1979. Twenty-five Italian sites were added during the 1990s, including 10 sites added at the 21st session held in Naples in 1997. Italy has served as a member of the World Heritage Committee five times, 1978–1985, 1987–1993, 1993–1999, 1999–2001, and 2021–2025.

Out of Italy's 62 heritage sites, 56 are cultural and 6 are natural. Seven sites are transnational. The Historic Centre of Rome is shared with the Vatican; the Monte San Giorgio and Rhaetian Railway with Switzerland; the Venetian Works of Defence with Croatia and Montenegro; the Prehistoric pile dwellings around the Alps with 5 other countries; The Great Spa Towns of Europe with 6 other countries; and the Ancient and Primeval Beech Forests of the Carpathians and Other Regions of Europe are shared with 17 other countries. In addition, Italy has 30 sites on the tentative list.

== World Heritage Sites ==
UNESCO lists sites under ten criteria; each entry must meet at least one of the criteria. Criteria i through vi are cultural, and vii through x are natural.

* Transnational site

World Heritage Sites
Site	Image	Location (region)	Year listed	UNESCO data	Description
Rock Drawings in Valcamonica	Rock drawing of an animal	Lombardy	1979	94; iii, vi (cultural)	Valcamonica is home to one of the largest collections of petroglyphs in the world. Over 140,000 carvings were created in the valley over a period of 8,000 years from the Epipalaeolithic to the Middle Ages. They depict scenes from agriculture, navigation, war, and magic.
Historic Centre of Rome, the Properties of the Holy See in that City Enjoying Extraterritorial Rights and San Paolo Fuori le Mura*	Coloseum building	Lazio	1980	91ter; i, ii, iii, iv, vi (cultural)	The city of Rome was the centre of the Roman Empire, and later, of the Christian world. It is home to a large number of major monuments of antiquity, including the Colosseum (pictured), the Pantheon, and the Roman Forum, as well as buildings from the Renaissance and Baroque periods. Originally listed as the "Historic Centre of Rome", the site was expanded in 1990 and renamed to the current name. Another boundary modification took place in 2015. The site is shared with the Holy See.
Church and Dominican Convent of Santa Maria delle Grazie with "The Last Supper" by Leonardo da Vinci	A church in red brick	Lombardy	1980	93; i, ii (cultural)	The complex of the Dominican Convent in Milan was constructed in the second half of the 15th century; it is partially attributed to Bramante. The northern wall of the refectory of the convent features the mural of The Last Supper by Leonardo da Vinci, a masterpiece of High Renaissance art.
Historic Centre of Florence	Arno river and the Historic Centre of Florence	Tuscany	1982	174ter; i, ii, iii, iv, vi (cultural)	The city of Florence is the symbol of the Renaissance and was an important centre of Renaissance humanism. It has had a profound influence on the architecture and arts of Italy and Europe, being associated with artists such as Giotto, Brunelleschi, Botticelli, and Michelangelo. Monuments in the city include the Florence Cathedral, Basilica of Santa Croce, the Uffizi, and the Palazzo Pitti. Minor boundary modifications of the site took place in 2015 and 2021. Piazza della Signoria is pictured.
Venice and its Lagoon	A channel in Venice with boats parked	Veneto	1987	394; i, ii, iii, iv, v, vi (cultural)	The city of Venice was founded in the 5th century and developed into a major maritime power, the Republic of Venice, in the 10th century. It is built on over 100 islands in the lagoon and contains monuments such as the St Mark's Basilica, the Doge's Palace, and numerous churches and bridges. Even after its decline in political power, Venice remained influential in the field of arts, with the innovations by painters Bellini, Giorgione, Titian, Tintoretto, Veronese, and Tiepolo. Venice is also associated with the 13th-century explorer Marco Polo.
Piazza del Duomo, Pisa	White church, leaning tower and a circular baptistery	Tuscany	1987	395bis; i, ii, iv, vi (cultural)	Piazza dei Miracoli is one of the finest medieval architectural complexes in the world and comprises four masterpieces from the 11th to 14th century: the cathedral, the baptistry, the cemetery, and the leaning tower. The Pisan Romanesque style developed here was influential in other Tuscan cities. The complex is also associated with Galileo Galilei, who conducted his experiments there. A minor boundary modification took place in 2007.
Historic Centre of San Gimignano	A small town dominated by many tall stone towers	Tuscany	1990	550; i, iii, iv (cultural)	The town of San Gimignano was an important stop for pilgrims on the Via Francigena in the Middle Ages. The city preserves its medieval character, with its most prominent feature being the high towers, built between the 11th and the 13th century by noble families and upper middle-class merchants. Fourteen of these towers have survived to the present day. Churches and palaces of the town are home to several masterpieces of artists from the 14th and 15th centuries.
The Sassi and the Park of the Rupestrian Churches of Matera	Structures built into the rock	Basilicata	1993	670; iii, iv, v (cultural)	This site comprises two districts of Matera, with cave dwellings first occupied in the Paleolithic. People inhabited the natural caves in the karst plateau of Murge and later started carving and building more elaborate structures, including churches, monasteries, and hermitages. The Romanesque Matera Cathedral dates to the 13th century.
City of Vicenza and the Palladian Villas of the Veneto	A villa with columns in front	Veneto	1994	712; i, ii (cultural)	In the 16th century, while under the Republic of Venice, several villas were built in the city of Vicenza and the surrounding Veneto region by the architect Andrea Palladio (1508–80). His designs had a profound influence on the architecture and inspired the Palladian style. Originally listed in 1994 as "Vicenza, City of Palladio", the site was expanded in 1996 to include several villas in the region. Villa Chiericati is pictured.
Historic Centre of Siena	Central square in Siena with a large gothic cathedral	Tuscany	1995	717; i, ii, iv (cultural)	The city of Siena has preserved its medieval Gothic character from the 12th to 15th century. The city is built around the Piazza del Campo. Several important Renaissance painters worked and were born in Siena, including Duccio, Ambrogio Lorenzetti, and Simone Martini. The Siena Cathedral is pictured.
Historic Centre of Naples	A large stone castle	Campania	1995	726bis; ii, iv (cultural)	Naples, founded in 470 BCE by Greek colonists, was one of the most important cities of Magna Grecia, of the Roman Republic, and the capital of the Kingdom of Naples under several royal houses. It was highly influential on European arts and architecture. Some of the important monuments include the Church of Santa Chiara from the 14th century, the Castel Nuovo from the 13th century (pictured), and the Royal Palace from the 17th century. A minor boundary modification took place in 2011.
Crespi d'Adda	A row of parallel and connected factory buildings	Lombardy	1995	730; iv, v (cultural)	Crespi d'Adda is a well preserved company town built in the 19th and 20th centuries for the workforce of a textile manufacturer Cristoforo Crespi. The town includes both residential buildings and common public services such as a clinic, a school, theatre, and sports centre. Some of the buildings are still in use.
Ferrara, City of the Renaissance, and its Po Delta	A castle in red brick	Emilia-Romagna	1995	733bis; ii, iii, iv, v, vi (cultural)	Ferrara, the seat of the House of Este, was an intellectual and artistic centre during the Italian Renaissance of the 15th and 16th centuries. It attracted artists to decorate several mansions and palaces (Este Castle pictured), while the architectural school influenced the styles in Italy and Europe. Originally listed as "Ferrara, city of the Renaissance", the site was expanded in 1999 to include the cultural landscape of the Po Delta.
Castel del Monte	Octagonal castle with a tower on each of the eight corners.	Apulia	1996	398rev; i, ii, iii (cultural)	The octagonal castle was built by Emperor Frederick II in the 13th century. It blends northern European Cistercian Gothic, Muslim architecture, and elements from Classical antiquity in a perfectly symmetrical design.
The Trulli of Alberobello	Small white houses with conic roofs	Apulia	1996	787; iii, iv, v (cultural)	The trulli are traditional limestone huts, typical of the Apulia region. They were constructed from at least the mid-14th century in a prehistoric drywall technique, usually featuring conical, domed or pyramidal roofs of corbelled stone slabs. The World Heritage Site lists the trulli in the town of Alberobello, with over 1500 preserved structures.
Early Christian Monuments of Ravenna	A church in red brick	Emilia-Romagna	1996	788; i, ii, iii, iv (cultural)	This site comprises eight monuments in the city of Ravenna, which was the seat of the Roman Empire in the 5th century. The churches and mausolea are decorated with mosaics of outstanding artistic quality that mix motifs from Western and Byzantine arts. The Basilica of San Vitale is pictured.
Historic Centre of the City of Pienza	Town square with Renaissance buildings	Tuscany	1996	789; i, ii, iv (cultural)	In 1459, Pope Pius II decided to transform his hometown of Pienza according to Renaissance Humanist ideas of urban design. The project was supervised by the architect Bernardo Rossellino who built new squares, churches, and palaces. Pienza was later a model for urban development in other Italian and European cities.
18th-Century Royal Palace at Caserta with the Park, the Aqueduct of Vanvitelli, and the San Leucio Complex	A palace with a large park in the background	Campania	1997	549rev; i, ii, iii, iv (cultural)	This large scale palace complex was commissioned by the Bourbon King of Naples Charles III in the mid-18th century. It was designed by the architect Luigi Vanvitelli and inspired by palaces in Versailles and Madrid. Following the ideas of the Enlightenment, the complex is well integrated into the landscape. The site includes an aqueduct and the industrial complex of San Leucio where silk was produced.
Residences of the Royal House of Savoy	Large symmetrical palace complex with white walls	Piedmont	1997	823bis; i, ii, iv, v (cultural)	This site comprises 22 palaces and villas constructed to demonstrate the power of the ruling monarchy following the move of the capital of the House of Savoy to Turin by Emmanuel Philibert in 1562. The buildings, mostly in Baroque style, are representative of 17th and 18th century European monumental architecture. A minor boundary modification took place in 2010. The Palazzina di caccia of Stupinigi is pictured.
Botanical Garden (Orto Botanico), Padua	A garden fountain in the middle	Veneto	1997	824; ii, iii (cultural)	Padua's botanical garden was founded in 1545 as the world's first university botanical garden. It has been a centre of scientific research for centuries, as well as a template for other gardens. It was renovated in the 18th century but still retains its original layout.
Portovenere, Cinque Terre, and the Islands (Palmaria, Tino and Tinetto)	A coastal town with multi storied colorful houses.	Liguria	1997	826bis; ii, iv, v (cultural)	The cultural landscape along the Ligurian coast has been shaped by humans over the past millennium. There are several scenic small towns built among the steep rugged terrain, and the land has been converted to terraces. There are also three islands off the coast with remains of early monastic buildings. A minor boundary modification took place in 2021. A church in Porto Venere is pictured.
Cathedral, Torre Civica and Piazza Grande, Modena	A white stone church with one tall tower.	Emilia-Romagna	1997	827; i, ii, iii, iv (cultural)	The 12th-century complex, comprising the cathedral, the tower, and the square, is an excellent example of early Romanesque art, with strong influence on the development of the style. The cathedral was designed by the architect Lanfranco and decorated by the sculptor Wiligelmo.
Archaeological Areas of Pompei, Herculaneum and Torre Annunziata	A street with ruined houses.	Campania	1997	829; iii, iv, v (cultural)	This site comprises three sites that were buried under volcanic ash during the eruption of Mount Vesuvius in 79 CE. The towns of Pompeii and Herculaneum are two Roman towns that have been preserved completely and provide insight into the life in the 1st century CE while the two villas at Torre Annunziata have well preserved wall paintings. The sites have been progressively excavated since the mid-18th century.
Amalfi Coast (Costiera Amalfitana)	Mountainous coastline with terraces and buildings	Campania	1997	830; ii, iv, v (cultural)	The Mediterranean cultural landscape of the Amalfi Coast was shaped prominently during the time of the medieval Duchy of Amalfi (from the 9th to 11th century) in a mixture of Western and Byzantine influences. The coast includes towns, such as Amalfi and Ravello, as well as vineyards, orchards, and pastures, at the point where the mountains are touching the sea.
Archaeological Area of Agrigento	Ruins of a classical temple with columns	Sicily	1997	831; i, ii, iii, iv (cultural)	Agrigento, a Greek colony founded in the 6th century BCE, developed into one of the major cities of Magna Graecia and of the Mediterranean. Several Doric temples have been preserved, and they represent one of the most notable sites of Greek art and culture.
Villa Romana del Casale	Villa del Casale's basilica with marble panels	Sicily	1997	832; i, ii, iii (cultural)	The villa in Piazza Armerina is one of the most luxurious Roman villas built in the early 4th century, and is a representative example of the economy and social structure of its period. It is richly decorated with mosaics of exceptional quality, it represents the finest in situ collection of Roman mosaics in the world.
Su Nuraxi di Barumini	A stone ruin	Sardinia	1997	833; i, iii, iv (cultural)	Su Nuraxi is the finest and the most complete example of nuraghe, a defensive megalithic structure of the Bronze Age Nuragic civilization of the 2nd millennium BCE. Unique to Sardinia, nuraghi are circular defensive towers in the form of truncated cones with internal chambers. The one at Su Nuraxi was originally over 18.5 m (61 ft) high. The site was abandoned in the 6th century BCE and most nuraghi went out of use after Roman colonization in the 2nd century BCE.
Archaeological Area and the Patriarchal Basilica of Aquileia	Church in stone and a baptistery	Friuli-Venezia Giulia	1998	825ter; iii, iv, vi (cultural)	Aquileia was one of the wealthiest cities of the early Roman Empire. In 452, it was sacked by the Huns under Attila; most of the ancient city now remains preserved and unexcavated. The Patriarchal Basilica, with its mosaic floors, dates to the 4th century. It was rebuilt between the 11th and 14th centuries. It played a major role in the spreading of Christianity to a large part of Central Europe in the early Middle Ages. Minor boundary modifications took place in 2017 and 2018.
Historic Centre of Urbino	Panorama of a city	Marche	1998	828; ii, iv (cultural)	In the 15th century, Urbino flourished under the leadership of Federico da Montefeltro, a humanist who attracted some of the most prominent scientists and artists to the city. The city's Renaissance architecture has been largely preserved as Urbino entered cultural and economic stagnation from the 16th century onward.
Cilento and Vallo di Diano National Park with the Archeological sites of Paestum and Velia, and the Certosa di Padula	Ruins of a temple with columns	Campania	1998	842; iii, iv (cultural)	The cultural landscape was shaped by different societies through centuries, including Etruscans, Lucanians, Greek colonists, and later Romans. The site includes the remains of Paestum and Velia, two major towns from classical times. The Carthusian monastery Certosa di Padula dates to 1306, although most of the present buildings are from the 17th and 18th centuries in the Baroque style.
Villa Adriana, Tivoli	Roman ruins with columns around a pool	Lazio	1999	907; i, ii, iii (cultural)	Villa Adriana or "Hadrian's Villa" in Tivoli, outside Rome, was built in the 2nd century CE as a retreat for the Emperor Hadrian. It combines architectural elements from Greece, Egypt, and Rome. The complex includes residential and recreational buildings, gardens, and pools. Its rediscovery in the mid-15th century influenced the architects of the Renaissance and Baroque periods.
City of Verona	Gothic monument with a horseman	Veneto	2000	797rev; ii, iv (cultural)	Verona, founded as a Roman town in the 1st century BCE, has developed uninterruptedly for over 2,000 years and preserves urban structures and monuments from different periods. They include the Roman amphiteatre and Roman gate, the Gothic Scaliger Tombs (pictured), as well as several historic squares and palaces.
Isole Eolie (Aeolian Islands)	A group of volcanic islands from above	Sicily	2000	908; viii (natural)	This archipelago off the coast of Sicily has been extensively studied by geologists at least since the 18th century. The islands contain several classical features of volcanic landforms, which were important in the development of volcanology as a scientific discipline. Two types of volcanic eruptions bear names after the islands of the archipelago, Strombolian and Vulcanian.
Assisi, the Basilica of San Francesco and Other Franciscan Sites	Basilica di San Francesco in Assisi	Umbria	2000	990; i, ii, iii, iv, vi (cultural)	Assisi was the birthplace of Saint Francis, founder of the Franciscan order. The Basilica was built in the 13th century. It features paintings by Cimabue, Pietro Lorenzetti, Simone Martini, and Giotto, and has been a reference point for Italian and Western art.
Villa d'Este, Tivoli	Panoramic view of Villa d'Este with gardens and sculptures	Lazio	2001	1025; i, ii, iii, iv, vi (cultural)	The 16th century-gardens of Vila d'Este are one of the first and best examples of Italian Renaissance gardens. The gardens have a geometric layout in line with Renaissance aesthetics and are decorated with pools and fountains, designed by Pirro Ligorio. They had a large influence on European garden design.
Late Baroque Towns of the Val di Noto (South-Eastern Sicily)	A baroque church, front view	Sicily	2002	1024; i, ii, iv, v (cultural)	In 1693, a powerful earthquake hit Sicily, destroying several towns and cities. In the aftermath, the towns of Caltagirone, Militello Val di Catania, Catania, Modica, Noto, Palazzolo, Ragusa, and Scicli were rebuilt in line with the Baroque urban planning trends. They represent the pinnacle of late Baroque art in Europe.
Sacri Monti of Piedmont and Lombardy	A church and surrounding buildings	Lombardy, Piedmont	2003	1068rev; ii, iv (cultural)	The phenomena of Sacri Monti (Sacred Mountains) began at the end of the 15th century with an aim of creating alternative pilgrimage and prayer sites due to inaccessibility of the Holy Land. The site comprises nine such complexes in Piedmont and Lombardy built in the late 16th and 17th centuries. They are rich in arts and are well integrated into the landscape. The Sacred Mount Calvary of Domodossola is pictured.
Val d'Orcia	Hilly grass landscape	Tuscany	2004	1026rev; iv, vi (cultural)	The cultural landscape of Val d'Orcia in the hinterland of Siena was carefully redesigned during the 14th and 15th century in line with the Renaissance aesthetical ideals. The landscape consists of small villages, towns, fields, pastures, meadows, and small farms. It has featured prominently on the paintings of the Sienese School.
Etruscan Necropolises of Cerveteri and Tarquinia	Wall painting depicting people banqueting and two leopards	Lazio	2004	1158; i, iii, iv (cultural)	Cerveteri and Tarquinia are two Etruscan cemeteries from the 9th to the 1st century BCE. Several tombs that were designed as replicas of Etruscan houses are decorated with outstanding wall paintings depicting scenes of daily life (the Tomb of the Leopards pictured).
Syracuse and the Rocky Necropolis of Pantalica	Rock caves on a hillside	Sicily	2005	1200; ii, iii, iv, vi (cultural)	Syracuse was founded in the 8th century BCE by the Corinthians and became one of the most important cities of Magna Graecia. An important monument from this period is the Doric Temple of Apollo. The Necropolis of Pantalica (pictured) contains more than 5,000 tombs, most dating from the 13th to the 7th centuries BCE, and remains of Byzantine era structures.
Genoa: Le Strade Nuove and the system of the Palazzi dei Rolli	A large palace with a beige facade	Liguria	2006	1211; ii, iv (cultural)	This site comprises two urban developments in Genoa from the 16th and 17th centuries, when the Republic of Genoa was at the peak of its power. Le Strade Nuove (New Streets) are a group of streets (including Via Giuseppe Garibaldi) built by the Genoese aristocracy. The Palazzi dei Rolli (Palaces of the Lists) are a group of Renaissance and Baroque palaces which were associated to a particular system of public lodging in private residences, whereby notable guests on State visit to the Republic were hosted in one of these palaces on behalf of the State. Palazzo Cattaneo Belimbau is pictured.
Rhaetian Railway in the Albula / Bernina Landscapes*	A train at a train station	Lombardy	2008	1276; ii, iv (cultural)	The Albula and Bernina lines of the Rhaetian Railway are two historic railway lines that cross the Swiss Alps. They were built in the early 20th century, providing a rapid and easy route into many formerly isolated alpine settlements. Building the railroads required overcoming technical challenges with bridges, galleries, and tunnels. The site is shared with Switzerland. The train station in Tirano is pictured.
Mantua and Sabbioneta	Mantua panorama	Lombardy	2008	1287; ii, iii (cultural)	These two towns represent two approaches of Renaissance period town planning. Mantua (pictured), originating in Roman times and preserving structures from the 11th century, was renovated in the 15th and 16th centuries. On the other hand, Sabbioneta was founded in the second half of the 16th century by Vespasiano I Gonzaga and built with a grid plan, according to the period's vision of an ideal city.
The Dolomites	Mountain scenery	Friuli-Venezia Giulia, Trentino-South Tyrol, Veneto	2009	1237rev; vii, viii (natural)	This site comprises nine areas of the Dolomites, a mountain range in the northern Italian Alps. There are 18 peaks above 3,000 m (9,800 ft), with mountain scenery including sheer rocky cliffs, vertical walls, long and narrow valleys. From the geological perspective, the rocks contain fossils record of marine life in the Triassic period. Marmolada is pictured.
Monte San Giorgio*	A wooded mountain and a lake.	Lombardy	2010	1090; viii (natural)	Monte San Giorgio, overlooking Lake Lugano, preserves the best fossil record of marine life from the Triassic Period (245–230 million years ago). In that period, the area was a tropical lagoon, flourishing with reptiles, fish, bivalves, ammonites, echinoderms, and crustaceans. Fossils of terrestrial animals are also preserved. The part of the property in Switzerland was listed in 2003 and expanded to include the Italian part in 2010.
Longobards in Italy. Places of the power (568-774 A.D.)	Stucco figures of saints	Apulia, Campania, Friuli-Venezia Giulia, Lombardy, Umbria	2011	1318; ii, iii, vi (cultural)	This site comprises seven groups of monasteries, churches, and fortresses associated with the Longobards who ruled in Italy from the 6th to the 8th century. The arts and architecture reflect the synthesis of Roman, Christian, and Germanic influences. The monuments listed are located in Brescia, Cividale del Friuli (artwork in the Oratorio di Santa Maria in Valle pictured), Castelseprio, Spoleto, Campello sul Clitunno, Benevento, and Monte Sant'Angelo. Its architecture marks a synthesis of various styles and the transition to the Middle Ages.
Prehistoric Pile dwellings around the Alps*	Pile dwelling house, reconstruction	Friuli-Venezia Giulia, Lombardy, Piedmont, Trentino-South Tyrol, Veneto	2011	1363; iv, v (cultural)	This transnational site (shared with Austria, France, Germany, Slovenia, and Switzerland) contains 111 small individual sites with the remains of prehistoric pile-dwelling (or stilt house) settlements in and around the Alps built from around 5000 to 500 BCE on the edges of lakes, rivers, or wetlands. They contain a wealth of information on life and trade in agrarian Neolithic and Bronze Age cultures in Alpine Europe. Nineteen sites are located in Italy, the reconstruction of a house at Ledro is pictured.
Medici Villas and Gardens in Tuscany	A villa on the slope of a hill	Tuscany	2013	175; ii, iv, vi (cultural)	This site comprises twelve villas and two gardens built under the patronage of the Medici family from the 15th to 17th centuries in Tuscany. They represent a new type of aristocratic residences, in departure from military castles or rich farms. The villas and gardens were places of leisure, arts, and knowledge, and they were designed in line with the principles of Renaissance humanism. The Villa Medici in Fiesole is pictured.
Mount Etna	Mt Etna, covered with snow, with a city in front	Sicily	2013	1427; viii (natural)	Mount Etna is the most active stratovolcano in the world, as well as one of the most studied volcanoes, with at least 2,700 years of documented history. It features several typical volcanic phenomena, such as cinder cones, lava flows, and lava caves. The mountain is home to several endemic animal and plant species.
Vineyard Landscape of Piedmont: Langhe-Roero and Monferrato	Hilly area with vineyards	Piedmont	2014	1390rev; iii, v (cultural)	Winegrowing and processing for Piemonte wine has taken place in this area since at least the 5th century BCE. The cultural landscape contains vineyards, villages, cellars, farms, and Romanesque churches. The site comprises five wine-producing areas and the Castle of Grinzane Cavour.
Arab-Norman Palermo and the Cathedral Churches of Cefalù and Monreale	Church and a palm tree in front	Sicily	2015	1487; ii, iv (cultural)	This site comprises nine buildings, constructed during the time of the Norman Kingdom of Sicily (1130–1194) in a style that incorporates features of Arab, Byzantine, and Western art. Two palaces, three churches, three cathedrals (Palermo Cathedral pictured), and the Admiral's Bridge are listed.
Ancient and Primeval Beech Forests of the Carpathians and Other Regions of Europe*	Forest and mountain landscape	Abruzzo, Apulia, Basilicata, Calabria, Emilia-Romagna, Lazio	2017	1133ter; ix (natural)	The primeval beech forests provide an essential resource for understanding the history and evolution of the beech tree (Fagus sylvatica) over the last million years. The site was first listed in 2007 in Slovakia and Ukraine. It was extended in 2011, 2017, and 2021 to include forests in a total of 18 countries. The 13 forests listed in Italy were inscribed in 2017 and 2021. Val Fondillo is pictured.
Venetian Works of Defence between the 16th and 17th centuries: Stato da Terra – Western Stato da Mar*	Map of a star fort	Friuli-Venezia Giulia, Lombardy, Veneto	2017	1533; iii, iv (cultural)	This property consists of six components of defence works in Italy, Croatia, and Montenegro, spanning more than 1,000 km (620 mi) between the Lombard region of Italy and the eastern Adriatic Coast. The design of the fortifications (termed alla moderna) was marked by the introduction of gunpowder to warfare, which led to significant shifts in military techniques and architecture. Three sites are listed in Italy: the star fort of Palmanova (map pictured) and the fortifications of Bergamo and Peschiera del Garda.
Ivrea, Industrial City of the 20th Century	Industrial buildings	Piedmont	2018	1538bis; iv (cultural)	The Industrial City of Ivrea was founded in 1908 by Camillo Olivetti, head of the company Olivetti S.p.A. that produced typewriters, mechanical calculators, and office computers. The city was, mostly between 1930 and the 1960s, designed in line with the ideas of the political Community Movement. The complex includes industrial, residential, and public buildings, and expresses a modern vision of the relationship between industrial production and architecture. A minor boundary modification took place in 2021.
The Prosecco Hills of Conegliano and Valdobbiadene. ("Le Colline del Prosecco di Conegliano e Valdobbiadene")	Panorama with vineyards	Veneto	2019	1571rev; v (cultural)	The cultural landscape of Conegliano and Valdobbiadene is characterized by hogback hills (ciglioni) that have been terraced and converted to vineyards since the 17th century. The region produces the Prosecco wine. The landscape also includes forests, hedges, farms, and villages.
The Great Spa Towns of Europe*	Spa in the ancient style with columns	Tuscany	2021	1613; ii, iii, iv, vi (cultural)	The Great Spa Towns of Europe comprises 11 spa towns in seven European countries where mineral waters were used for healing and therapeutic purposes before the development of industrial medication in the 19th century. The town of Montecatini Terme is listed in Italy.
Padua's fourteenth-century fresco cycles	Interior of a chapel covered by frescos	Veneto	2021	1623; ii (cultural)	The site comprises eight buildings, both religious and secular, in four clusters. They house fresco cycles that were painted between 1302 and 1397 by several prominent painters: Giotto, Guariento di Arpo, Giusto de' Menabuoi, Altichiero da Zevio, Jacopo d'Avanzi, and Jacopo da Verona. The frescos are innovative in their way of depicting allegorical narrative and use new techniques of perspective. The Scrovegni Chapel is pictured.
The Porticoes of Bologna	Street with porticoes on both sides	Emilia-Romagna	2021	1650; iv (cultural)	Porticoes represent an important cultural and architectural heritage of the city of Bologna. For centuries, they have been used as sheltered walkways and as prime locations for merchant activities. They were constructed in wood, brick, stone, and in the 20th century also in reinforced concrete. Sometimes they cover both sides of the street. Twelve portico complexes are listed.
Evaporitic Karst and Caves of Northern Apennines	Rocky barren landscape with some trees in the background	Emilia-Romagna	2023	1692; viii (natural)	This site comprises four areas with evaporite karst, two with Triassic anhydrites, and two with Messinian gypsum (example from the Gessi Bolognesi Park pictured). There are over 700 caves that exhibit a wide variety of karst features and contain rare minerals. They are also inhabited by several plant species, many of which are endangered.
Via Appia. Regina Viarum	Roman road, trees and plants around	Apulia, Basilicata, Campania, Lazio	2024	1708; iii, iv, vi (cultural)	Via Appia was one of the earliest and strategically most important Roman roads. Built in 312 BCE, it connected Rome and Brindisi. Revolutionary in road design, it bypassed towns along the way, featured several bridges and viaducts, it was paved with close-fitting slabs of dressed basalt, and it was toll-free and public. It was in use until the Middle Ages and, following renovations, even in later periods. The section at Casal Rotondo is pictured.
Funerary Tradition in the Prehistory of Sardinia – The domus de janas	Interior of a megalithic tomb	Sardinia	2025	1730; iii (cultural)	This site comprises sites of Pre-Nuragic cultures of Sardinia. They date from the Neolithic to Bronze Age, from the 5th to the 3rd millennium BCE. Sites include megalithic sites and hypogea, more specifically menhirs, dolmens, stone circles, and chamber tombs. The latter are called Domus de Janas, "The house of the fairies", and some have walls decorated with paintings. The tomb at Putifigari is pictured.
The system of Italian-style condominio theatres of the 18th and 19th centuries in Central Italy	Look at a theatre from the stage	Emilia-Romagna, Marche, Umbria	2026	1762; iii (cultural)	This site comprises ten theatres in the Central Italy. They date from the 16th to the 19th century and are often located in smaller towns, sometimes in municipal buildings or manor houses. The design of the theatres changed through centuries. They were visited by all social classes. They preserve rich libraries of text and musical sheets. The Teatro dell'Aquila in Fermo is pictured.

== Tentative list ==
In addition to the sites inscribed on the World Heritage List, member states can maintain a list of tentative sites that they may consider for nomination. Nominations for the World Heritage List are only accepted if the site has previously been listed on the tentative list. As of 2026, Italy recorded 30 tentative sites.

Tentative sites
Site	Image	Location (region)	Year listed	UNESCO criteria	Description
Lake Maggiore and Lake D'Orta lakelands	An island on a lake	Piedmont	2006	ii, vi (cultural)	The cultural landscape of the lakelands has been shaped since the 16th century, with villas and gardens constructed on the coasts of lakes and on the islands for wealthy owners. Since the 19th century, the area has become a popular holiday destination. The buildings are from the Renaissance, Baroque, and Neoclassical periods. San Giulio Island in Lake D'Orta is pictured.
Hanbury botanical gardens	Cacti and other plants in a garden	Liguria	2006	ii, iv (cultural)	The botanical gardens were set up by Sir Thomas Hanbury in the second half of the 19th century. The aims of the garden were to grow non-European exotic plants and botanical experimentations. The gardens became a prototype for the similar gardens in Liguria and beyond.
Orvieto	A decorated facade of a church	Umbria	2006	i, iv, v (cultural)	Orvieto was an Etruscan town which reached its peak between the 6th and 4th centuries BCE and then declined in the Roman times. In the Middle Ages, it rose to prominence in the 13th and 14th centuries, when the cathedral (pictured) was built. The highly decorated facade is a masterpiece of Italian Gothic architecture.
Villas of the Papal Nobility	A villa with yellow facade	Lazio	2006	i, ii, iii, iv (cultural)	This site comprises 15 suburban villas built from the second half of the 16th century onwards for higher clergymen and nobles related to the papal court. They were designed by some of the most prominent architects of the period, including Gian Lorenzo Bernini and Francesco Borromini, and they were decorated by leading artists. Villas are typically surrounded by parks and gardens. Villa Farnese is pictured.
Salento and the "Barocco Leccese"	A baroque church with highly decorated facade	Apulia	2006	i, iii, iv (cultural)	The Salento peninsula has been shaped by numerous civilizations over centuries, with prehistoric remains from the Messapians. A defining feature of the area is the so-called "Barocco Leccese", a form of Baroque that developed in Lecce during the Counter-Reformation. The style is highly decorative and aims to display the power of the Catholic Church. The Basilica of Santa Croce is pictured.
Cattolica Monastery in Stilo and Basilian-Byzantine complexes	A Byzantine-style church in red brick	Calabria	2006	ii, iii, iv (cultural)	Between the 6th and 11th centuries, Calabria was under the influence of the Byzantine Empire. This is reflected in the church architecture and the monasteries, often situated in caves. The monasteries attracted hermits fleeing from Syria and Egypt, bringing their traditions with them. The nomination comprises several churches and related buildings.
Archipelago of La Maddalena and Islands of Bocche di Bonifacio*	View of islands from above	Sardinia	2006	vii, ix, x (natural)	The archipelago is located in the Strait of Bonifacio between the islands of Sardinia and Corsica and is shared between Italy and France. The area is an important habitat for different cetacean species. The sea floor is covered by meadows of Posidonia oceanica.
Mothia Island and Lilibeo: The Phoenician-Punic Civilization in Italy	Ancient ruins	Sicily	2006	iii, iv, vi (cultural)	Mothia was a Punic settlement on an island off the coast of Sicily, founded in the 7th century BCE. Many carved stele have been preserved from the period. The town was sacked by the Syracusans in 398 BCE. The survivors settled in Lilibelo which developed into a military stronghold until it was taken over by the Romans during the Punic Wars. It prospered under the Romans as well.
Bradyseism in the Flegrea Area	Ancient ruins with three standing columns	Campania	2006	vii, viii, x (natural)	Bradyseism is the gradual uplift or descent of land caused by the filling or emptying of underground magma chambers. This effect is well demonstrated in the Macellum of Pozzuoli (formerly known as Serapeum, pictured), a Roman monument where marine molluscs bore holes in the columns that are now up to 7 m (23 ft) above the floor of the monument, indicating that the area was at some point submerged under the sea.
Cascata delle Marmore and Valnerina: Monastic sites and ancient hydrogeological reclamation works	A series of waterfalls	Umbria	2006	i, iv, v, vi (cultural)	Valnerina, the valley of the Nera river, attracted Syriac monks who settled there in the 4th century. In the following centuries, the hermitages developed into monasteries. The monks modified the terrain by draining the marshes and redirecting the rivers to create farming land. The Cascata delle Marmore (pictured) is an artificial waterfall, created by Consul Manius Curius Dentatus in 271 BCE to prevent flooding in the Rieti Valley. In modern times, hydroelectric power plants have been installed on the rivers.
Pelagos: The Cetacean Sanctuary*	A dolphin in the sea	Liguria, Sardinia, Tuscany	2006	vii, ix, x (natural)	The protected area off the coast of Liguria, Sardinia, and Tuscany, as well as in the territorial waters of Monaco and France, covers about 100,000 km^{2} (39,000 sq mi). It is home for many species of whales and other marine fauna. A striped dolphin is pictured.
Island of Asinara	Island view	Sardinia	2006	vii, ix, x (natural)	The island off the coast of Sardinia is interesting from the geological perspective, with rare black amphibolite, metamorphic rocks that are 950 million years old. The island has been inhabited since prehistory, used as pastures, and since the late 19th century as a prison, penal colony, concentration camp for soldiers, and a quarantine station.
Sulcis Iglesiente	Coal mine elevator towers	Sardinia	2006	ix, x (natural)	Iglesiente, on the island of Sardinia, is the most important mining area in Italy. The deposits of lead, zinc, and silver were exploited by the Nuragic civilization, Punic people, and the Romans. In Sulcis, coal mines (infrastructure pictured) were set up in the 19th century. Mining ended in the late 20th century.
The Marble Basin of Carrara	Marble quarry	Tuscany	2006	ii, vi, vii, viii, ix, x (mixed)	High-quality marble was extracted from the Apuan Alps around Carrara already in the Roman times and there are several quarry sites from the Renaissance period. Technical heritage from different periods related to marble has been preserved as well.
The Transhumance: The Royal Shepherd's Track	A prairie	Abruzzo, Apulia, Campania, Molise	2006	ii, iii, x (mixed)	Transhumance is a type of pastoralism or nomadism, a seasonal movement of livestock between fixed summer and winter pastures. In Italy, this practice has origins in pre-Roman times and continues to the present day. Shepherd's tracks are connected into a network of roads with the supporting infrastructure such as taverns, sanctuaries, and weaving mills. Transhumance is practiced in Abruzzo (landscape pictured), Molise, Campania, and Apulia. The archaeological site of Saepinum is located at one of the tracks.
Volterra: Historical City and Cultural Landscape	Panorama of town, buildings in dark stone	Tuscany	2006	iv, v (cultural)	Volterra is a hilltop town that was settled by the Etruscans and later by the Romans. A Roman theatre has been preserved on the hill slope. In the 15th century, a Renaissance fortress was built under Lorenzo de' Medici. Today, the town mostly preserves its medieval character.
The Aniene valley and Villa Gregoriana in Tivoli	A decorated bridge	Lazio	2006	i, ii, iii, iv (cultural)	The Aniene valley was an important source of water for the city of Rome. The first aqueduct was built in the 2nd century BCE by praetor Quintus Marcius Rex and two more in the times of the Roman Empire. There are Roman temples in the valley as well. Villa Gregoriana (bridge pictured) is a park that was commissioned in 1835 by Pope Gregory XVI to rebuild and regulate the bed of the Aniene river which was damaged in the 1826 flood.
The Murge of Altamura	Grassy landscape with a dry stone wall	Apulia	2006	iii, vii, viii (mixed)	Murge is a karst plateau composed mostly of Mesozoic limestone. There are several karst phenomena present, including caves and sinkholes. Thousands of dinosaur footprints, dating to 70 million years ago, have been found in De Lucia quarry. The Altamura Man, a complete skeleton of a Neanderthal man who got trapped in the Lamalunga cave about 130,000 years ago, was discovered in 1993.
Karstic caves in prehistoric Apulia	A reconstruction of a petroglyph	Apulia	2006	i, ii, iii (cultural)	The Salento peninsula is composed of limestone and shows karst phenomena, including several caves. Grotta Romanelli in Castro and Grotta delle Veneri in Parabita were periodically inhabited in the Middle and Upper Paleolithic periods. Flake tools, bones, stone engravings and figurines have been found in the caves. Grotta dei Cervi near Otranto was occupied in the Neolithic. A reproduction of a petroglyph from the cave is pictured.
Citadel of Alessandria	A brick building behind a tree	Piedmont	2006	ii, iii, iv (cultural)	The bastion fort near the city of Alessandria was built in 1713 upon an older fortification, by the House of Savoy who came into possession of the area. It was further expanded and fortified by the French under Napoleon. The fort also played a role in 1859 during the Second Italian War of Independence. The armory building is pictured.
Mont Blanc massif*	Snow-covered mountains	Aosta Valley	2008	vii, viii, ix, x (natural)	Mont Blanc, with the height of 4,810 m (15,780 ft), is the highest peak of the Alps. The massif has several glaciers and is an important habitat for mountain flora and fauna. The nomination is shared with France and Switzerland.
The cultural landscape of the Benedictine settlements in medieval Italy	A monastery on the top of a hill	Campania, Lazio, Lombardy, Marche, Molise, Piedmont	2016	ii, v, vi (cultural)	This nomination comprises eight monasteries of Benedictines, a religious monastic order founded by Saint Benedict of Nursia in the 6th century. The monasteries were centres of culture and learning and were influential across Europe. They were located outside urban centres. The work of the monks has resulted in creation of a cultural landscape that focuses on coexistence with nature and preservation of the environment. Monte Cassino is pictured.
Mediterranean Alps*	Mountain scenery	Liguria, Piedmont	2017	viii (natural)	This transnational nomination, shared with France and Monaco, covers parts of the Maritime Alps and the Ligurian Alps. This section of the Alps is interesting from a geological perspective as it provides an example of an uneroded range which formed 30 million years ago during the Alpine orogeny upon rocks dating to the Variscan orogeny 400 million years ago. In less than 70 km (43 mi), the mountains drop from 3,297 m (10,817 ft) (Monte Argentera) to the depth of 2,500 m (8,200 ft) in the Mediterranean basin.
The Cultural Landscape of Civita di Bagnoregio	A town on the top of a hill	Lazio	2017	iii, v (cultural)	Civita di Bagnoregio is a town on the top of a hill that has been settled at least since the Etruscan times. The terrain is made of tuff and fragile clay and is prone to landslides and erosion. The town demonstrates the struggle of people against a changing environment and was important in the development of studies of landslide management.
Via Francigena in Italy	Road flanked by stone walls	Aosta Valley, Emilia-Romagna, Lazio, Liguria, Lombardy, Piedmont, Tuscany	2019	ii, iv, vi (cultural)	Via Francigena is a medieval network of roads that were used by the pilgrims from the lands of Franks on their way to Rome. Pilgrimages were an important feature of cultural exchange between Italy and Northern Europe. Supporting infrastructure for the travelers included sanctuaries, hospices, monasteries, churches, post stations, and civil buildings. A section of the road in Aosta Valley is pictured.
Eocene Marine Biodiversity of the Alpone Valley	A fish fossil	Veneto	2021	viii (natural)	The Lagerstätte around Verona is exceptionally rich with fossils from the Tethys Ocean during the Eocene epoch (between 56 and 34 million years ago). Fossils from this tropical ecosystem include fish and marine mammals, marine invertebrates such as bivalves, gastropods, and crustaceans, as well as crocodiles, turtles, and birds. Studies of fossils have been taking place since at least the 16th century. A fish from the Monte Bolca site is pictured.
Nuragic monuments of Sardinia	Ancient megalithic ruins	Sardinia	2021	ii, iv, v (cultural)	This nomination comprises 31 sites of the Nuragic civilization of Sardinia from the 2nd millennium BCE. The characteristic feature of this civilization are nuraghe, defensive megalithic structures. Apart from nuraghe, nominated sites also include the remains of temples, sanctuaries, and settlements. Su Nuraxi is already listed as a World Heritage Site. Nuraghe Majori is pictured.
The system of the Ville-fattoria in Chianti Classico	Landscape with vinyards and a large building	Tuscany	2023	ii, iv, v (cultural)	The cultural landscape between the provinces of Florence and Siena was developed in the 16th century, after Siena came under the influence of the House of Medici. The land organization was based on the Villa-fattoria system, which saw the centralization of the administration and modernization of agricultural production. The hilly terrain is especially appropriate for Chianti wine production (vinyards in Gaiole in Chianti pictured).
Evidence of Italo-Greek Culture between the Early and Late Middle Ages		Calabria	2023	ii, iii, vi (cultural)	The nomination includes sites that bear testimony to Greek-Byzantine culture in southern Italy: the city of Gerace, Baptistery of Santa Severina, Oratorium of San Marco a Rossano, Catholic of Stilo, and Orthodox Monastery of Saint Giovanni Theristìs in Bivongi (pictured).
Extension to the existing World Heritage Property "Ancient and Primeval Beech Forests of the Carpathians and Other Regions of Europe"*	An old-growth beech forest	Abruzzo, Lazio, Molise	2026	ix (natural)	This proposed extension includes certain areas currently protected as part of the site's buffer zone, as well as new components such as the remote Moricento forest (pictured), which encompasses a large number of beech trees over 500 years old.

== See also ==
- List of Intangible Cultural Heritage elements in Italy
- Tourism in Italy
