= List of Intangible Cultural Heritage elements in Italy =

The United Nations Educational, Scientific and Cultural Organisation (UNESCO) intangible cultural heritage elements are the non-physical traditions and practices performed by a people. As part of a country's cultural heritage, they include celebrations, festivals, performances, oral traditions, music, and the making of handicrafts. The "intangible cultural heritage" is defined by the Convention for the Safeguarding of Intangible Cultural Heritage, drafted in 2003 and took effect in 2006. Inscription of new heritage elements on the UNESCO Intangible Cultural Heritage Lists is determined by the Intergovernmental Committee for the Safeguarding of Intangible Cultural Heritage, an organisation established by the convention.

Italy ratified the convention 30 October 2007.

== Intangible Cultural Heritage of Humanity ==
+ Transnational element

=== Representative List ===
Name	Image	Year	No.	Description
Opera dei Pupi, Sicilian puppet theatre		2008	00011	The Opera dei Pupi is a marionette theatrical representation of romantic poems traditionally performed in Sicily.
Canto a tenore, Sardinian pastoral songs		2008	00165	The cantu a tenòre is a style of polyphonic folk singing characteristic of Sardinia.
Traditional violin craftsmanship in Cremona		2012	00719	The Cremona's traditional violin making is an ancient form of handicraft typical of Cremona, where bowed string instruments like violins, violas, cellos and double basses have been made since the 16th century.
Celebrations of big shoulder-borne processional structures		2013	00721	These celebrations are a particular form of Catholic procession which involves the use of large votive structures to be carried on the shoulders, particularly in Nola (Festa dei Gigli), Palmi (Varia di Palmi), Sassari (Discesa dei Candelieri), and Viterbo (Macchina di Santa Rosa).
Mediterranean diet + (Note: Shared with Croatia, Cyprus, Greece, Morocco, Portugal, and Spain.)		2013	00884	The Mediterranean diet is the traditional food and methods of preparation used by the people of the Mediterranean basin, as well as everything related to them.
Traditional agricultural practice of cultivating the 'vite ad alberello' (head-trained bush vines) of the community of Pantelleria		2014	00720	Vines traditional agricultural practice in Pantelleria.
Art of Neapolitan 'Pizzaiuolo'		2017	00722	The culinary practices of the Pizzaiuolo –the pizza baker–, in Naples.
Art of dry stone construction, knowledge and techniques + (Note: Shared with Croatia, Cyprus, France, Greece, Slovenia, Spain, Switzerland, Andorra, Austria, Belgium, Ireland, and Luxembourg.)		2018	02106	Dry stone is a building method by which structures are constructed from stones without any mortar to bind them together.
Celestinian forgiveness celebration		2019	01276	The Celestinian forgiveness is a religious and historical annual event held in L'Aquila.
Alpinism + (Note: Shared with France and Switzerland.)		2019	01471	Alpinism is a set of outdoor activities that involves ascending mountains.
Musical art of horn players, an instrumental technique linked to singing, breath control, vibrato, resonance of place and conviviality + (Note: Shared with Belgium, France, and Luxembourg.)		2020	01581	
The art of glass beads + (Note: Shared with France.)		2020	01591	The craft of glass beading dates back to ancient Egyptian and Roman civilizations and it is practiced particularly in Murano.
Falconry, a living human heritage + (Note: Shared with Austria, Belgium, Croatia, Czechia, France, Germany, Hungary, Ireland, Kazakhstan, Republic of Korea, Kyrgyzstan, Mongolia, Morocco, Netherlands, Pakistan, Poland, Portugal, Qatar, Saudi Arabia, Slovakia, Spain, Syria, and the United Arab Emirates.)		2021	01708	The origin of falconry goes back to the use of hunting by birds of prey as a mean of hunting but it has evolved over time to become part of the cultural heritage of the people.
Truffle hunting and extraction in Italy, traditional knowledge and practice		2021	01395	
Lipizzan horse breeding traditions + (Note: Shared with Austria, Bosnia and Herzegovina, Croatia, Hungary, Romania, Slovakia and Slovenia.)		2022	01687	
Transhumance, the seasonal droving of livestock + (Note: Shared with Albania, Andorra, Austria, Croatia, France, Greece, Luxembourg, Romania, and Spain.)		2023	01964	Transhumance is a type of pastoralism or nomadism, a seasonal movement of livestock between fixed summer and winter pastures.
Traditional irrigation: knowledge, technique, and organization + (Note: Shared with Austria, Belgium, Germany, Luxembourg, Netherlands, and Switzerland.)		2023	01979	
The practice of opera singing in Italy		2023	01980	
Manual bell ringing + (Note: Shared with Spain.)		2024	02100	
Italian cooking, between sustainability and biocultural diversity		2025	02093	

=== Good Safeguarding Practices ===
Name	Year	No.	Description
Tocatì, a shared programme for the safeguarding of traditional games and sports + (Note: Shared with Belgium, Croatia, Cyprus, and France.)	2022	01709	

== See also ==
- List of World Heritage Sites in Italy
