= Cattolica di Stilo =

Byzantine church in Calabria, Italy

Coordinates: 38°28′48″N 16°28′04″E

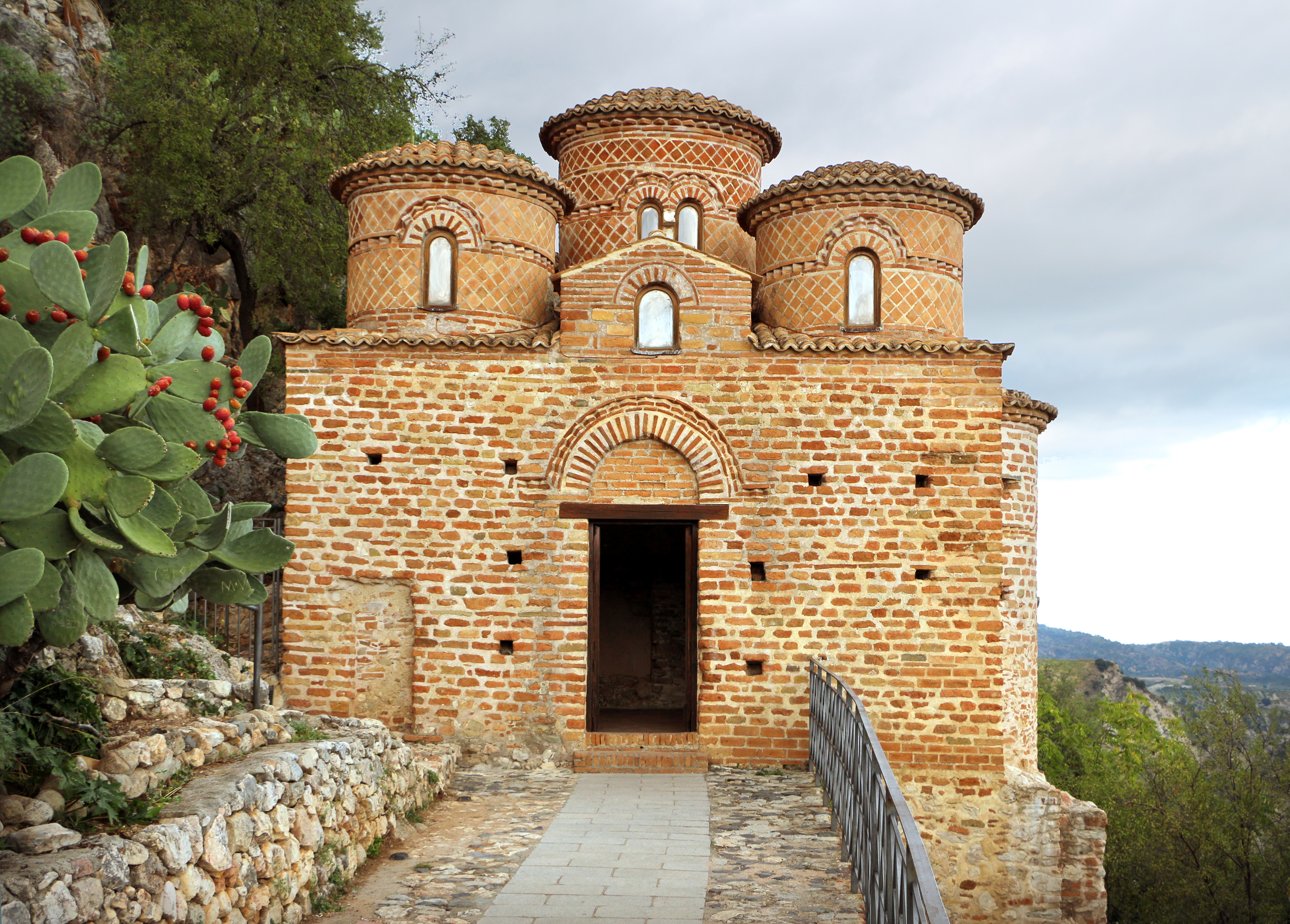
The Cattolica di Stilo

The Cattolica di Stilo is a Byzantine church in the comune of Stilo (Province of Reggio), Calabria, southern Italy. It is a national monument, and part of the "Evidence of Italo-Greek Culture between the Early and Late Middle Ages" proposed World Heritage Site.

== History ==
The Cattolica was built in the 9th century, when Calabria was part of the Byzantine Empire. The name derives from the Greek word katholiki, which referred to the churches provided with a baptistery. It is one of the most important examples of Byzantine architecture, together with the church of San Marco in Rossano Calabro.

== Architecture ==
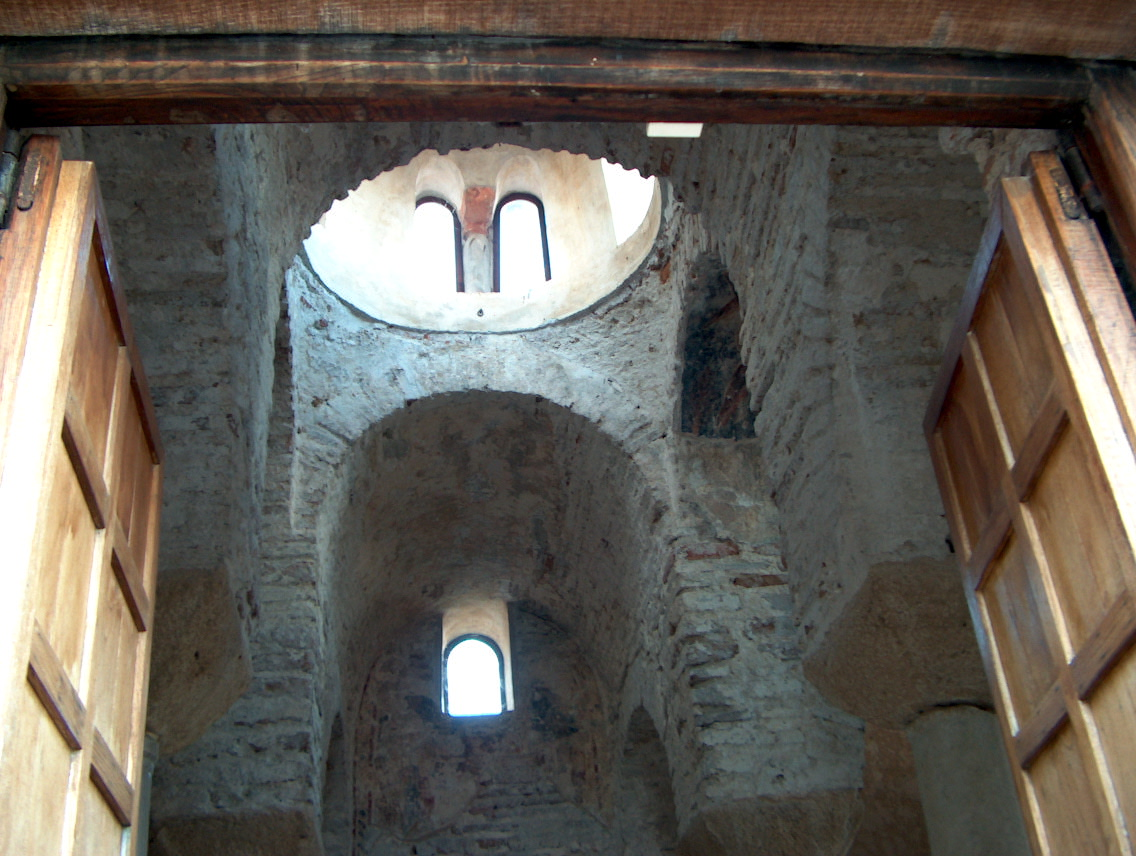
Internal view

The Cattolica is mainly built of brick. It follows a plan with "inscribed cross", typical of the middle Byzantine age. The interior is divided by four columns into five similar spaces. The square central space and the angled ones are covered by domes. The angled ones have tambours with the same diameter, while the central dome is slightly taller and larger.

The western sides lies on free rocks, while the southern area, ending with three apses, stands on three stone bases. The construction is in bricks.

The interior was once entirely covered with frescoes. The left apse has a bell built in 1577, when the church was converted to the Latin rite. The interior has also several inscriptions in Arabic, which have led scholars to suspect it could have been also used as a Muslim oratory. One inscription translates to "There is only one true God".

== Gallery ==
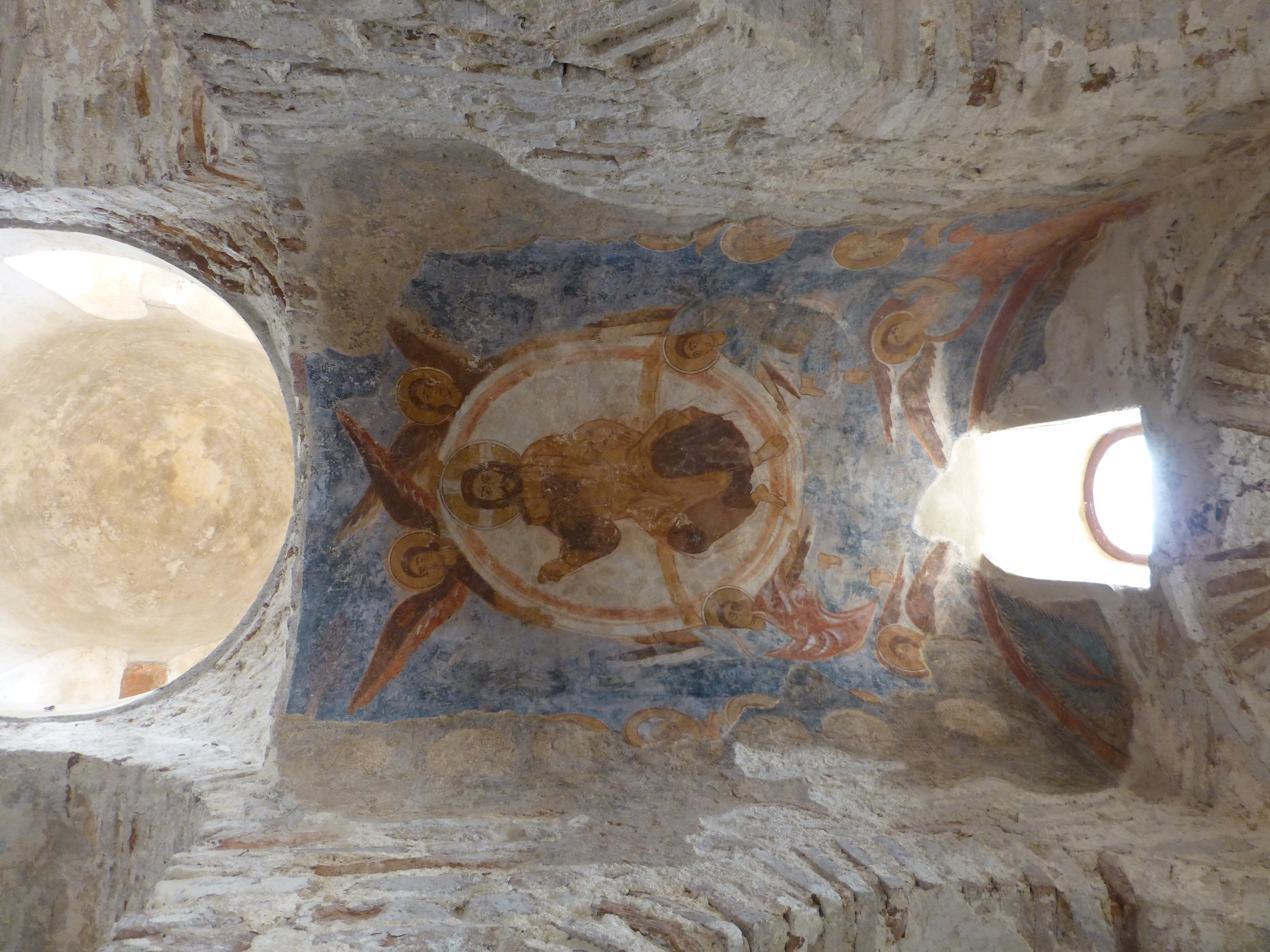
Fresco on the roof

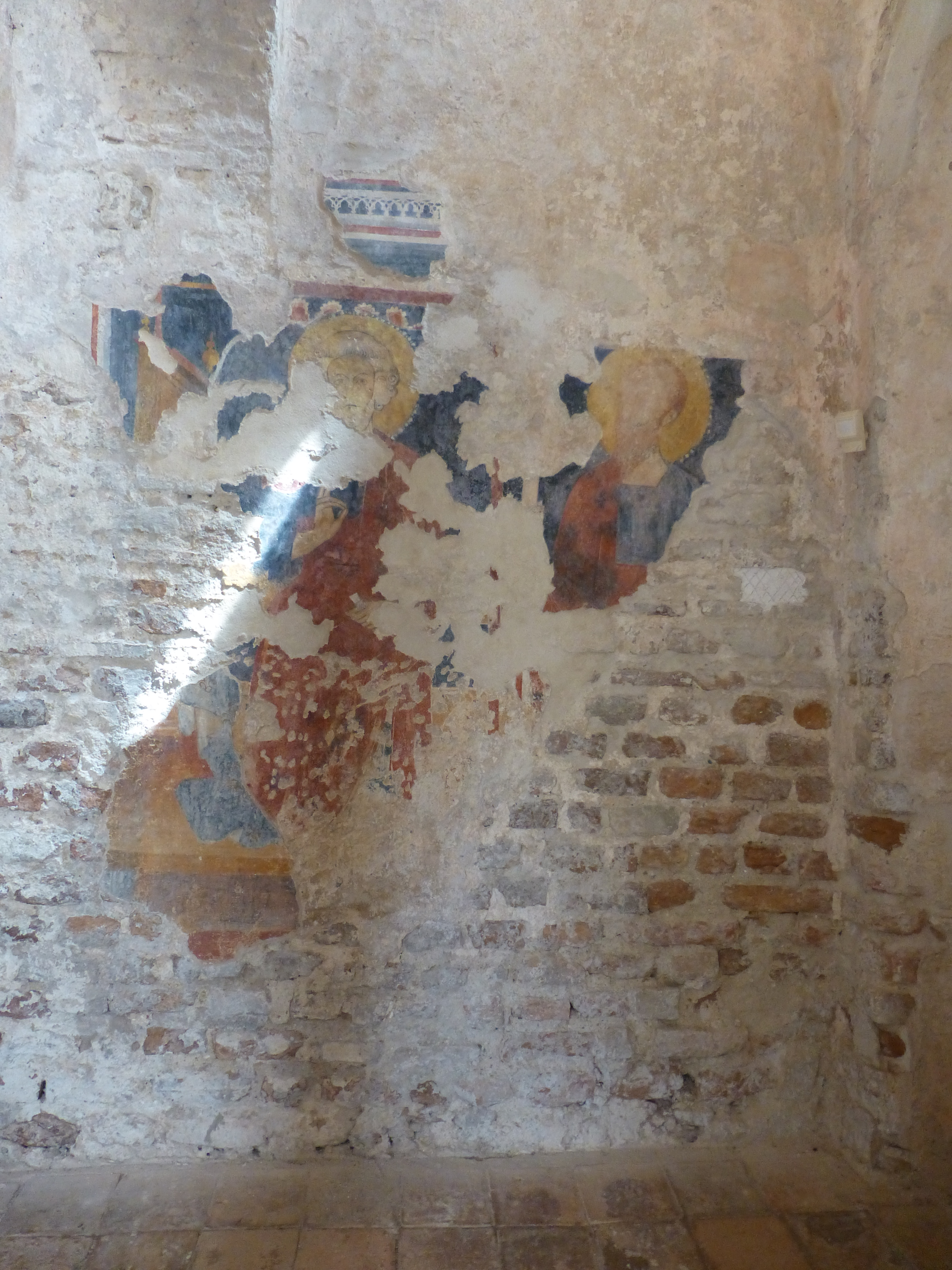
Fresco 1

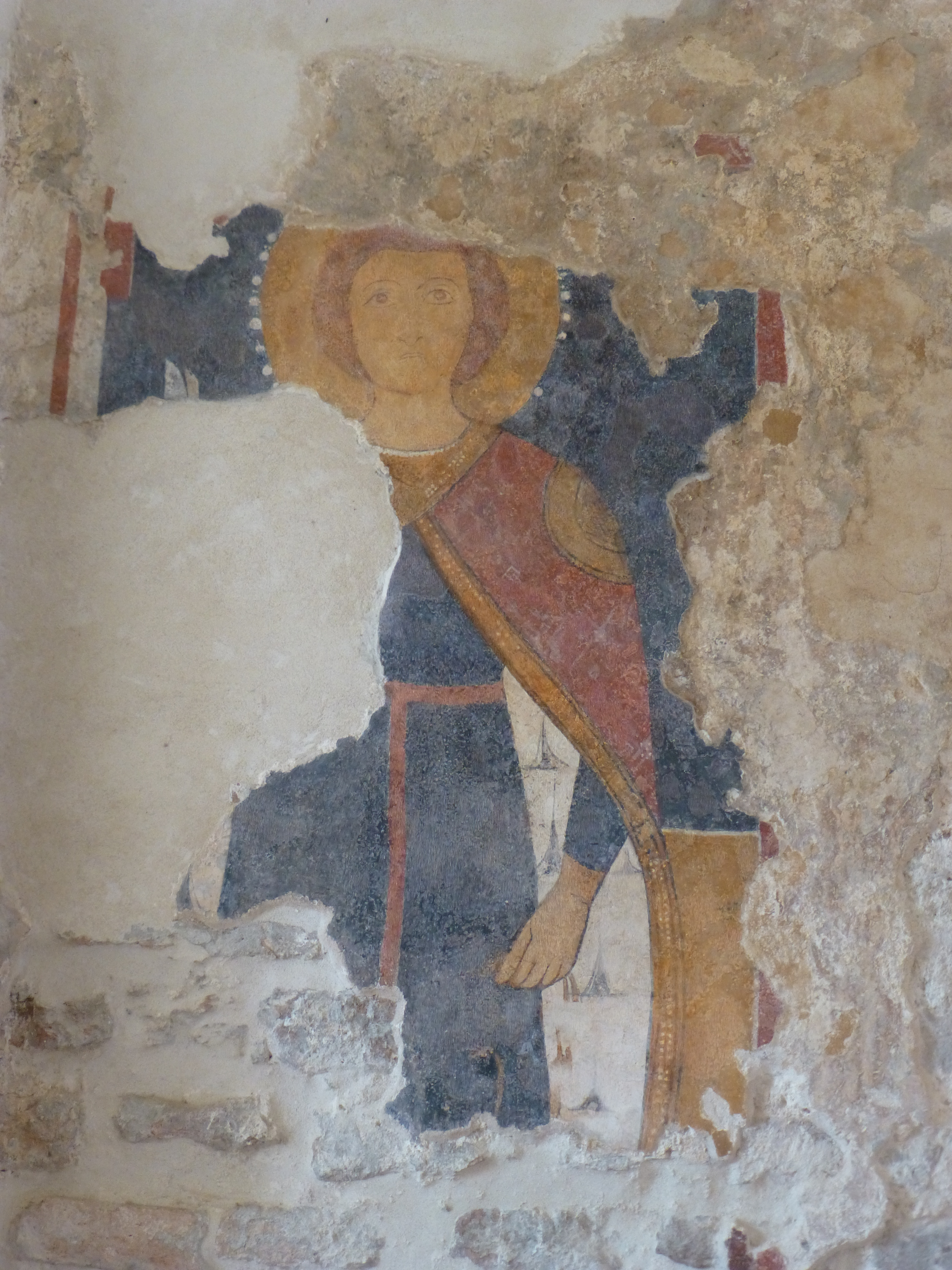
Fresco 2

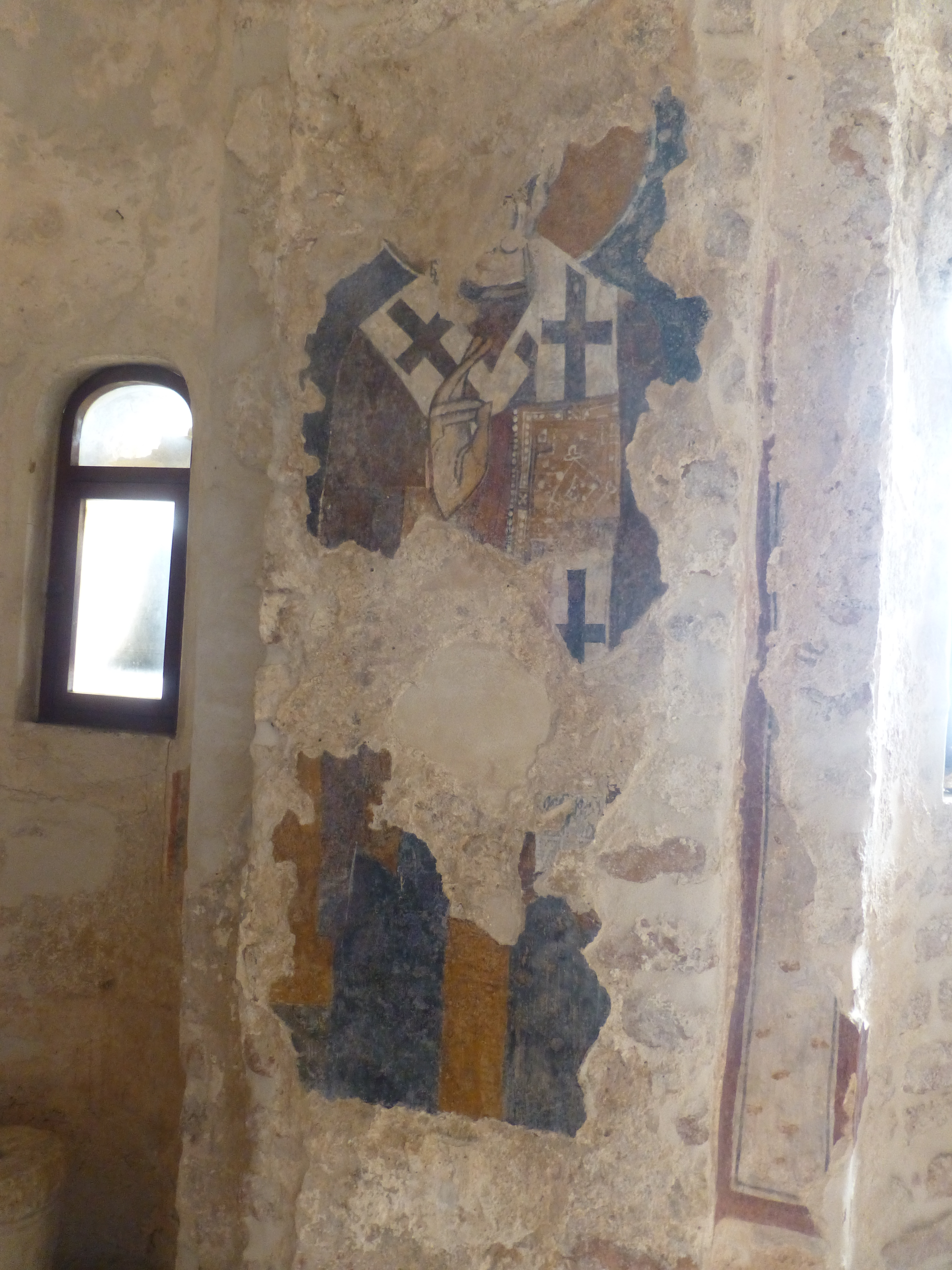
Fresco 3

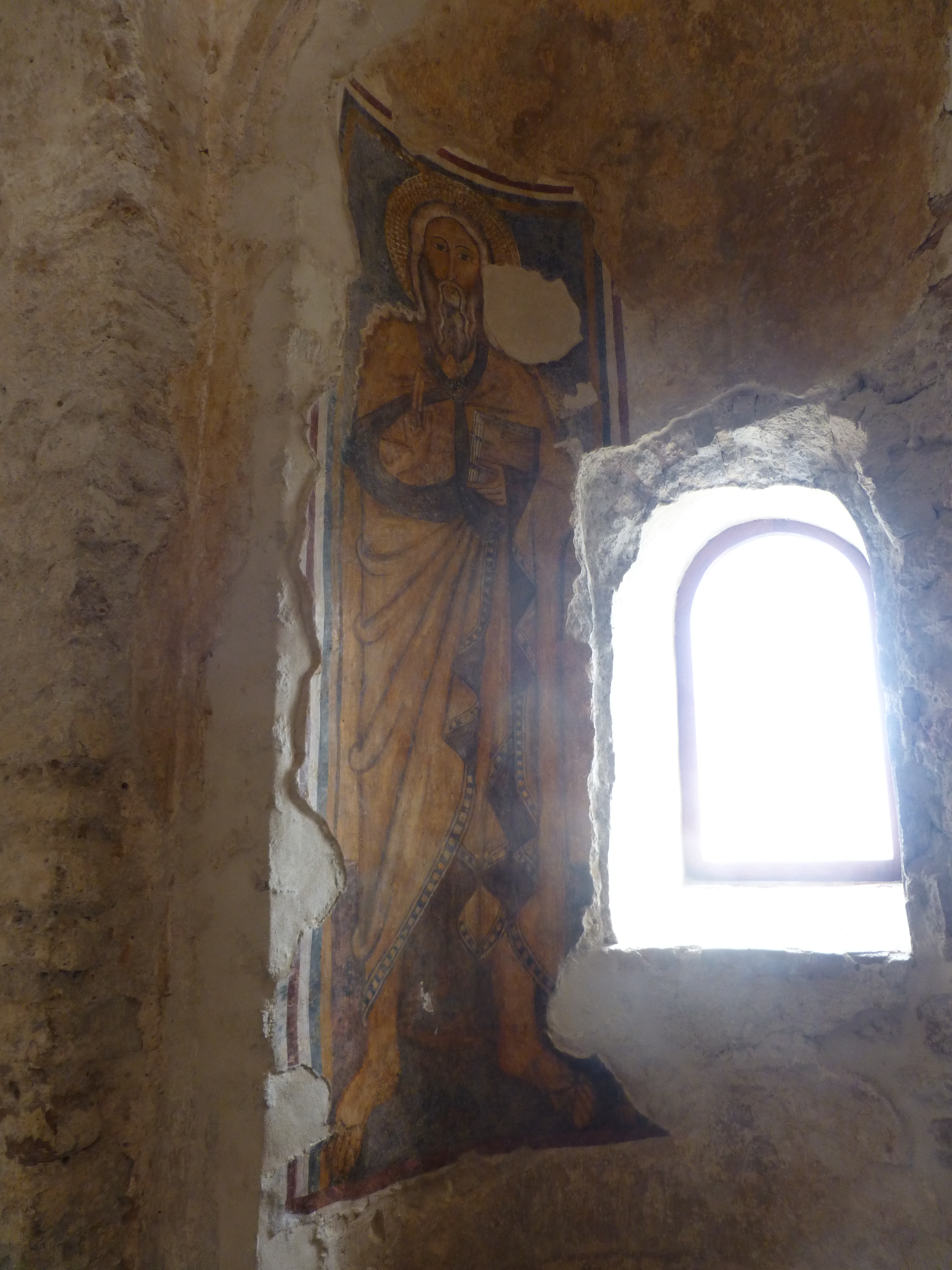
Fresco 4

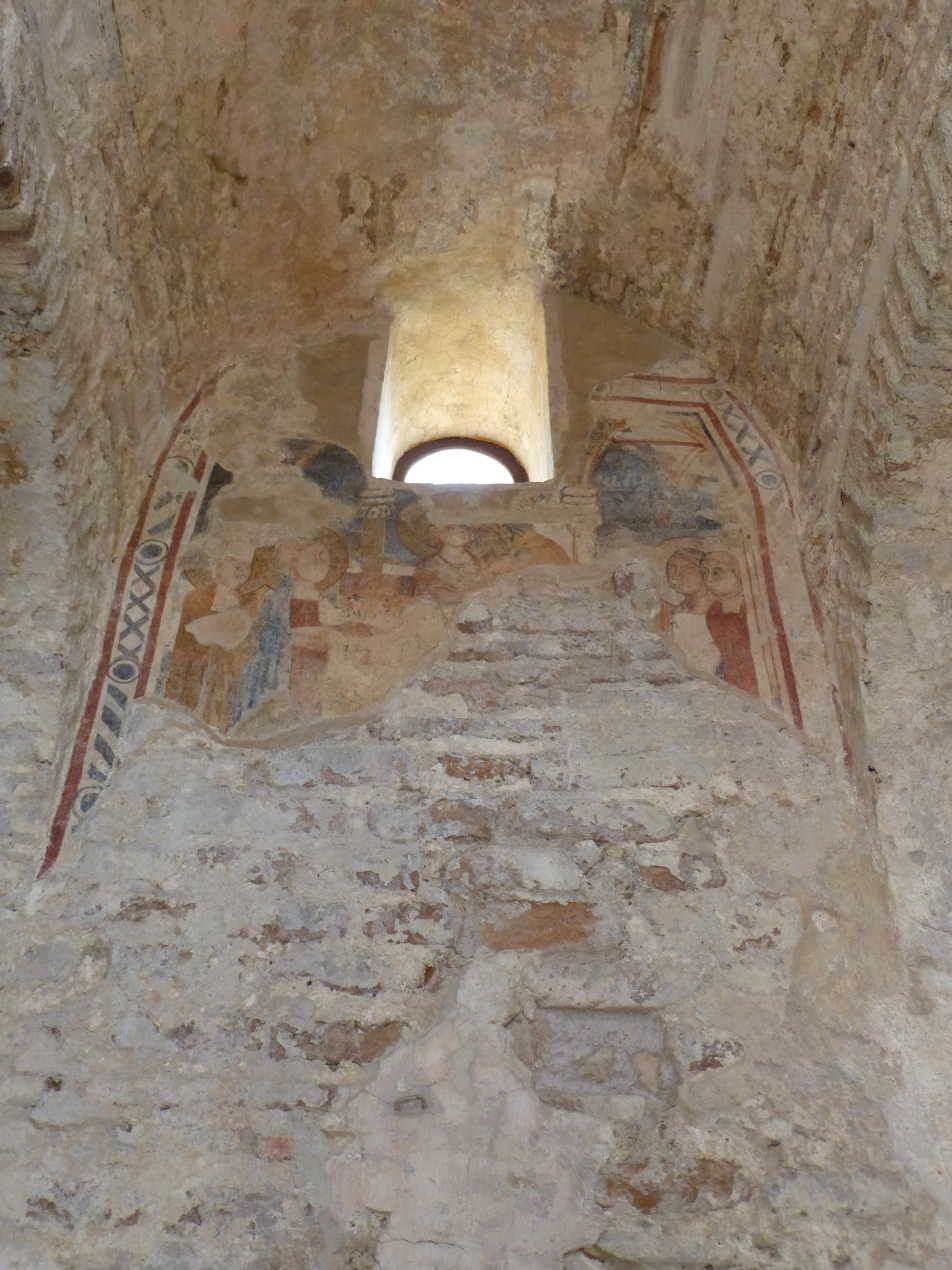
Fresco 5

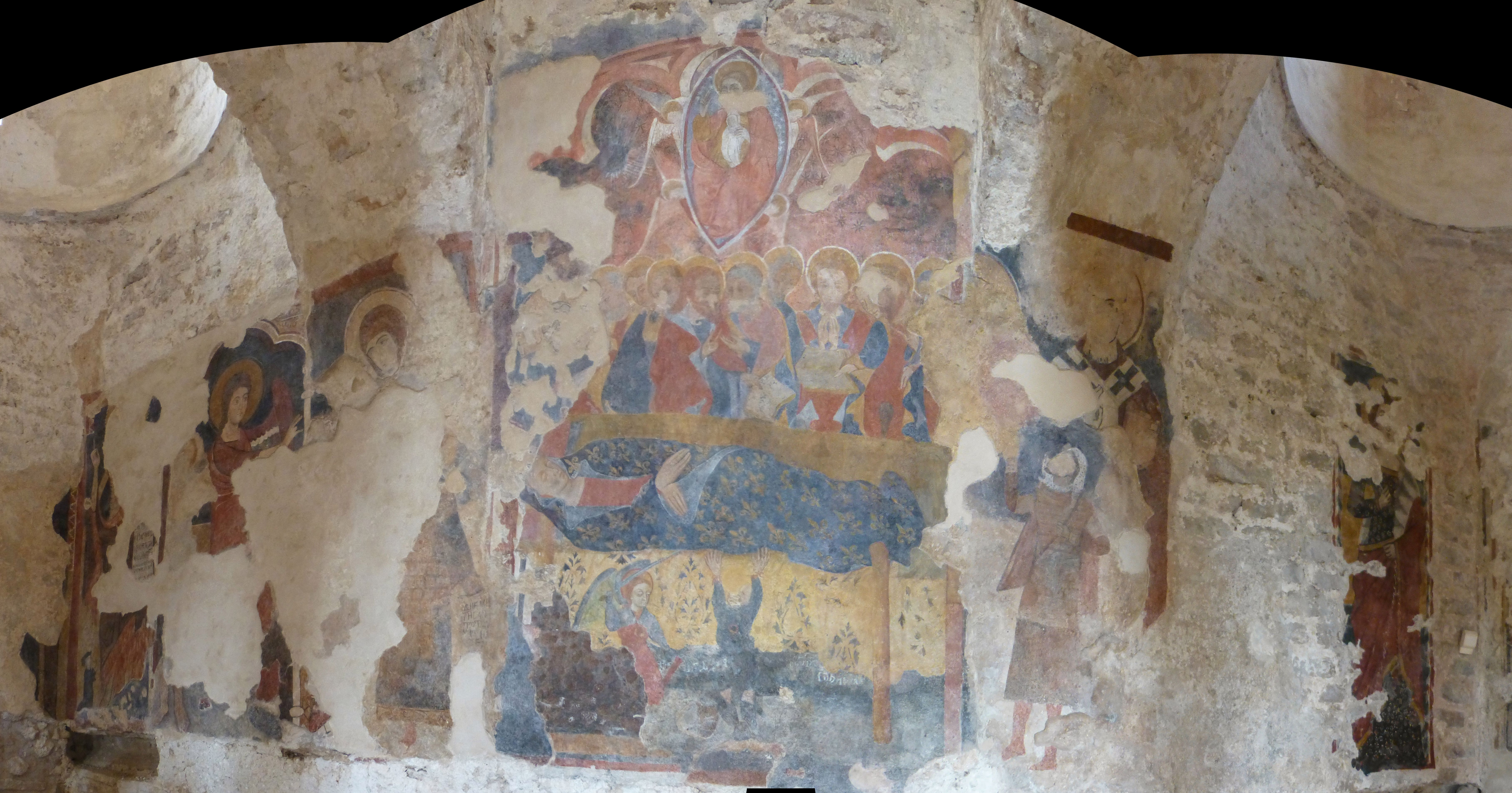
Fresco 6
