= Fortezza Medicea restaurant =

Occasional restaurant in Italy

Coordinates: 43°24′00″N 10°51′51″E

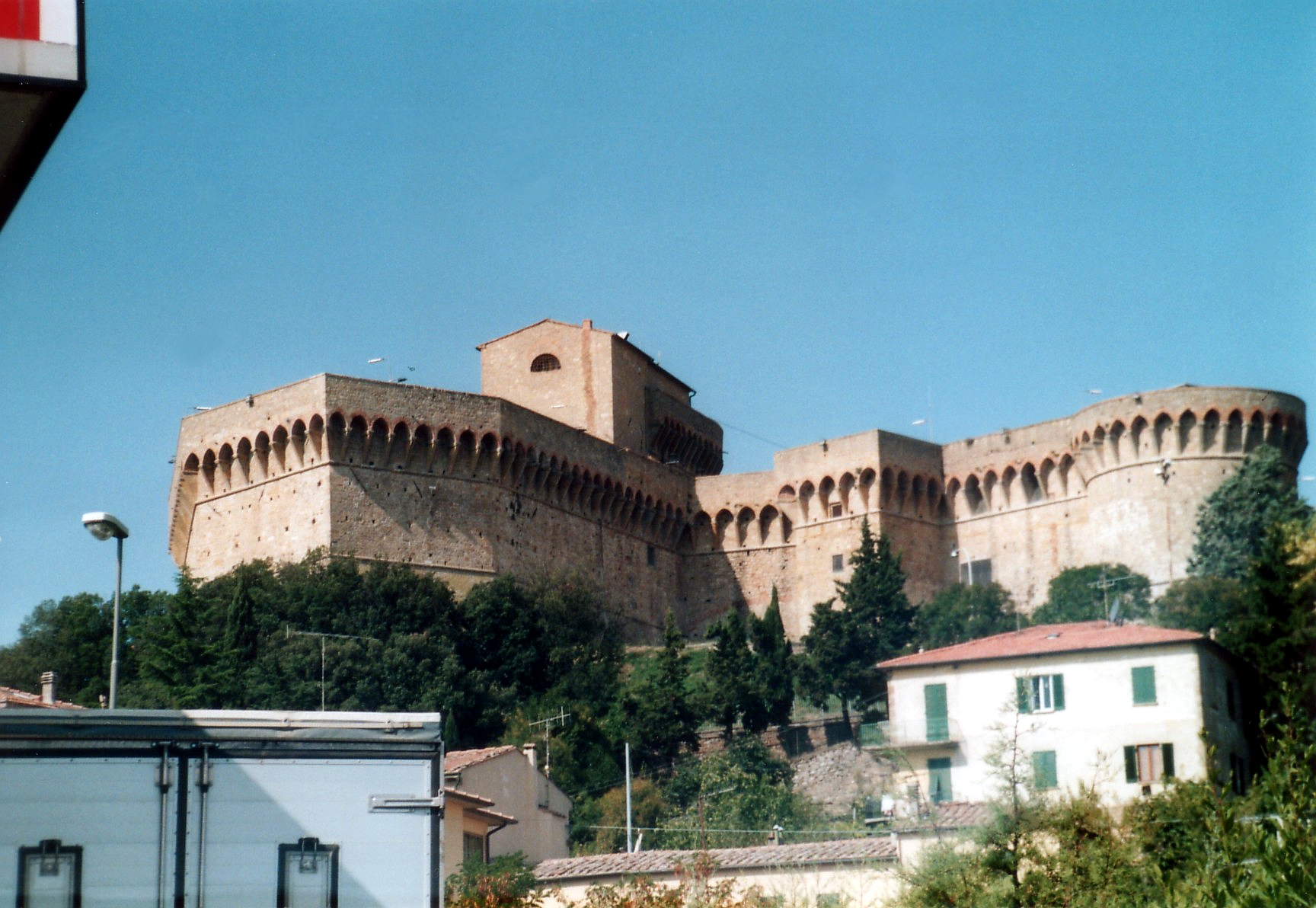
The medieval fortress and prison which houses the restaurant.

Fortezza Medicea restaurant (officially Cene Galeotte, 'convict dinners') is an occasional restaurant in Volterra, Italy. Gourmet dinners are cooked and served to paying guests by inmates in the prison housed in the town's Renaissance-era fortress (Fortezza Medicea, lit. 'Medician fortress'). The project began in 2006; it has been on hiatus since 2020.

The fortress, built in 1474, is a high-security prison for criminals serving at least seven years. In 2006, the prison administration instituted the occasional dinners as a rehabilitation scheme. Inmates selected for their good behaviour prepare a multi-course dinner and serve it at the prison. Proceeds are donated to charity. In the inaugural season, the chef was also an inmate, serving a life term; in subsequent years, invited guest chefs have presided. Guests must apply at least two weeks in advance, undergo a background check, and on arrival show identification and be assigned a registration number; cutlery is plastic.

The dinners proved popular and sell out weeks in advance. On release, several inmates have found restaurant jobs. The restaurant operates part-year, one day a month, serving a six-course meal in the former chapel or a courtyard. In September 2007, a seven-course medieval feast was served by inmates in period costume. Operations were suspended in 2020 because of the COVID-19 pandemic.
