= Su Nuraxi (Barumini) =

Archaeological site in Sardinia, Italy

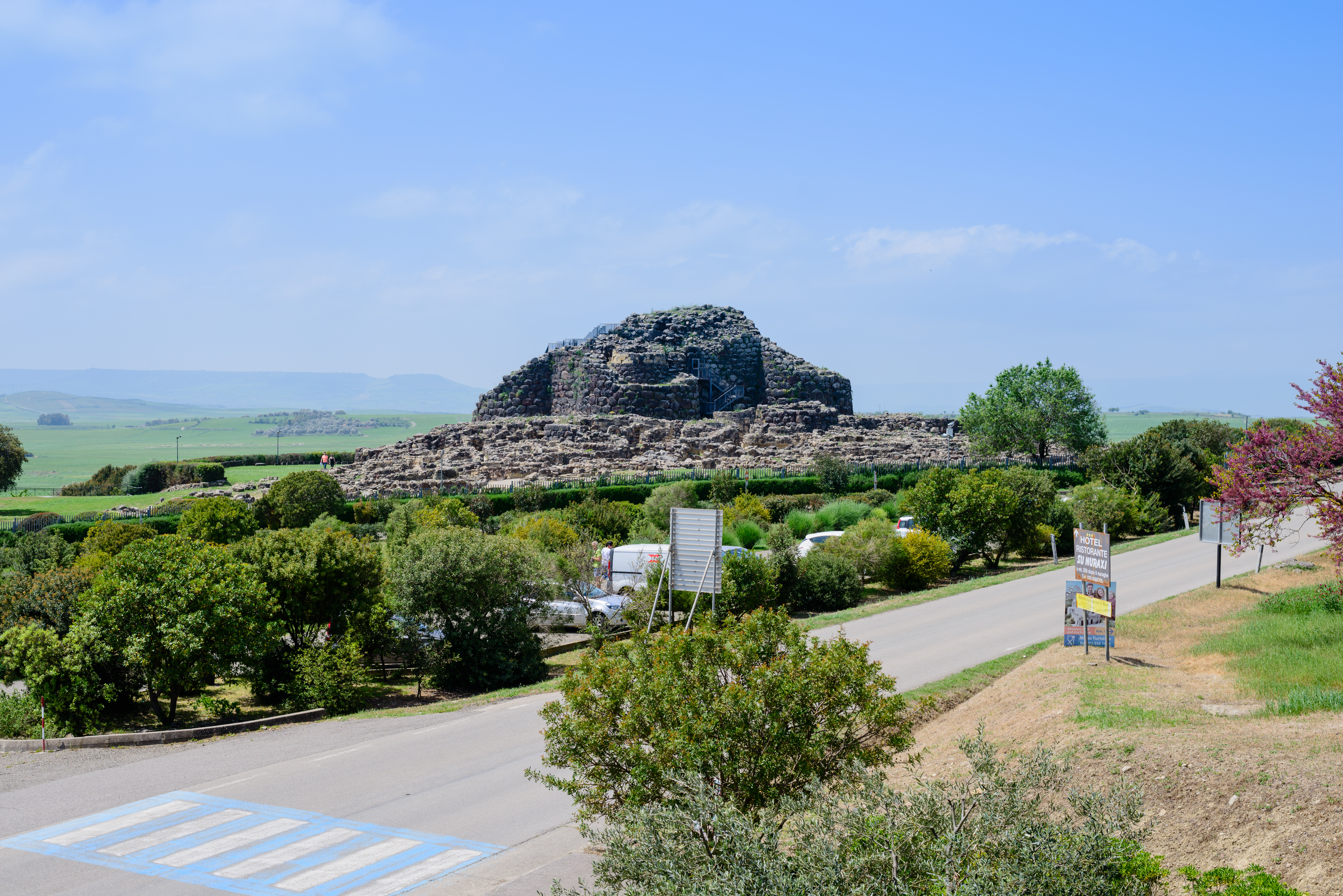
- Su Nuraxi in Barumini

- Map showing location in Sardinia
- 39°42′21″N 8°59′26″E
- Type: Settlement
- Periods: Bronze Age
- Cultures: Nuragic civilization
- Location: Barumini, Sardinia, Italy

History
- Built: 17th century BCE
- Abandoned: 6th century BCE

Site notes
- Excavation dates: 1950-1957
- Archaeologists: Giovanni Lilliu

UNESCO World Heritage Site
- Official name: Su Nuraxi di Barumini
- Type: Cultural
- Criteria: i, iii, iv
- Designated: 1997 (21st session)
- Reference no.: 833
- Region: Europe and North America

Su Nuraxi is a Nuragic archaeological site in Barumini, Sardinia, Italy. Su Nuraxi simply means "The Nuraghe" in Campidanese, the southern variant of the Sardinian language.

Su Nuraxi is a settlement consisting of a seventeenth century BC nuraghe, a bastion of four corner towers plus a central one, and a village inhabited from the thirteenth to the sixth century BC, developed around the nuraghe. They are considered by scholars the most impressive expression of the nuragic civilization and were included in the UNESCO list of World Heritage Sites in 1997 as Su Nuraxi di Barumini.

== Nuraghe ==
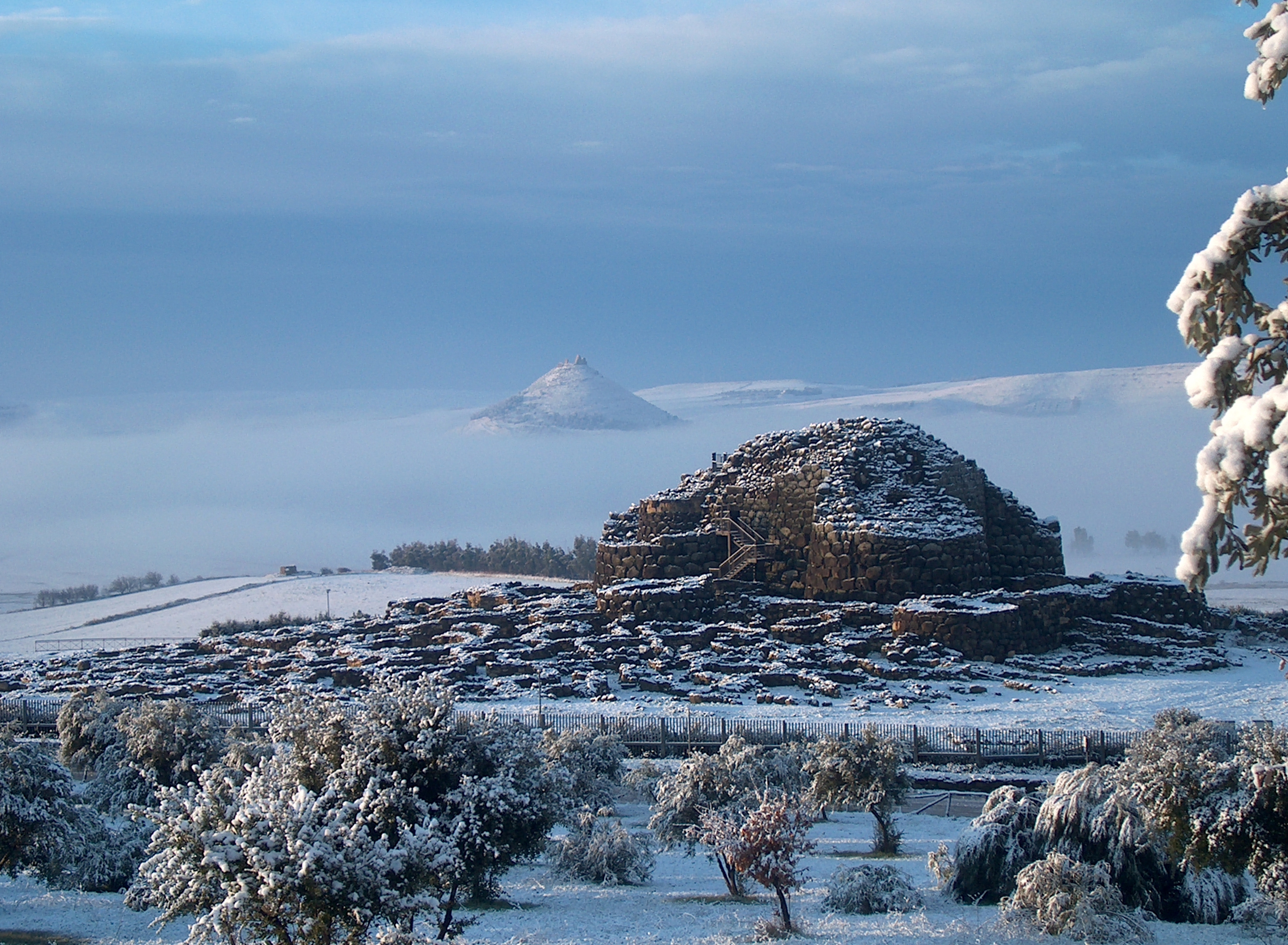
Su Nuraxi in winter

=== Structure ===
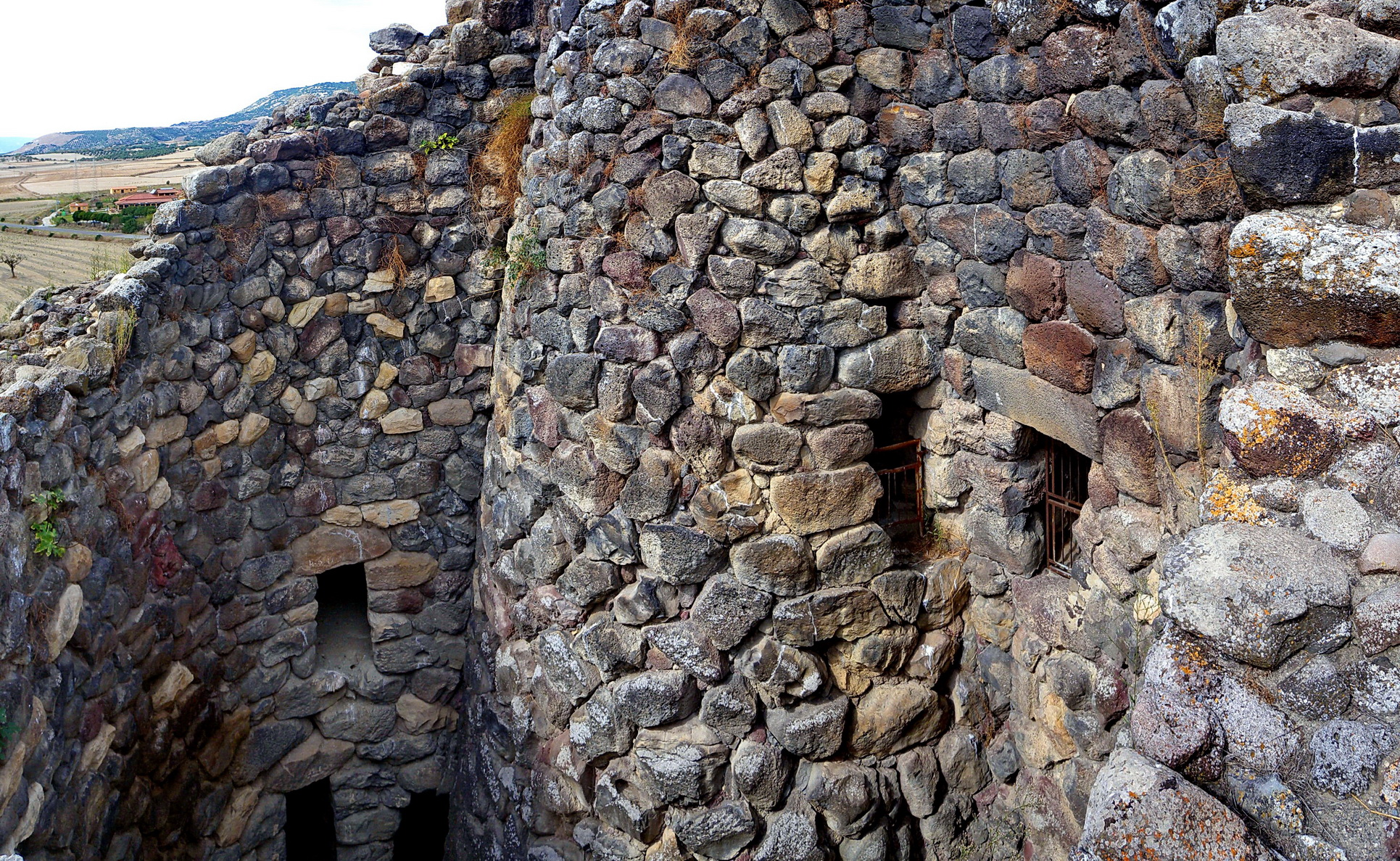
The main tower and the inner courtyard

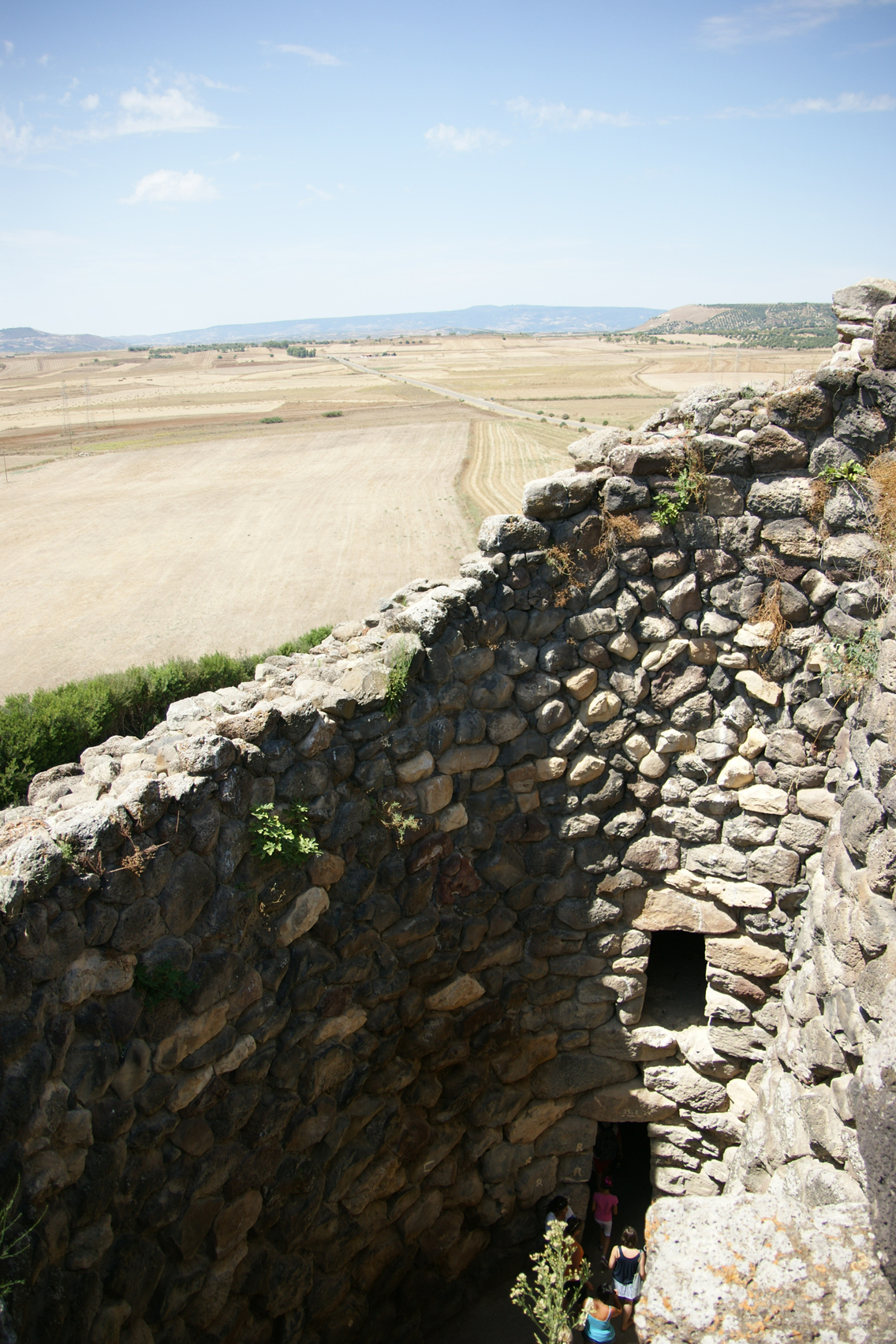
The Nuraghe and its countryside in summer

The oldest part of the Nuraghe consists of a central tower with three superposed chambers (18.6m high). It was built in blocks of basalt between the seventeenth and thirteenth centuries BCE. Later, during the Late Bronze Age, four towers joined by a curtain wall with an upper balcony (no longer extant) were built around the central tower, all communicating with an inner courtyard served by a well. During the Iron Age, the complex was surrounded by a curtain wall with seven lobes (heptalobate).

=== Function ===
The real function of the nuraghe is still debated. The discoverer of Su Nuraxi, the archaeologist Giovanni Lilliu, confirmed the traditional interpretation of fortress-site. Other archaeologists believe that the oldest part of the complex was destined for a religious purpose, refuge, civil or even parliament or registered the village chief, while the towers were added perhaps intended for military purposes and stock.

== Village ==
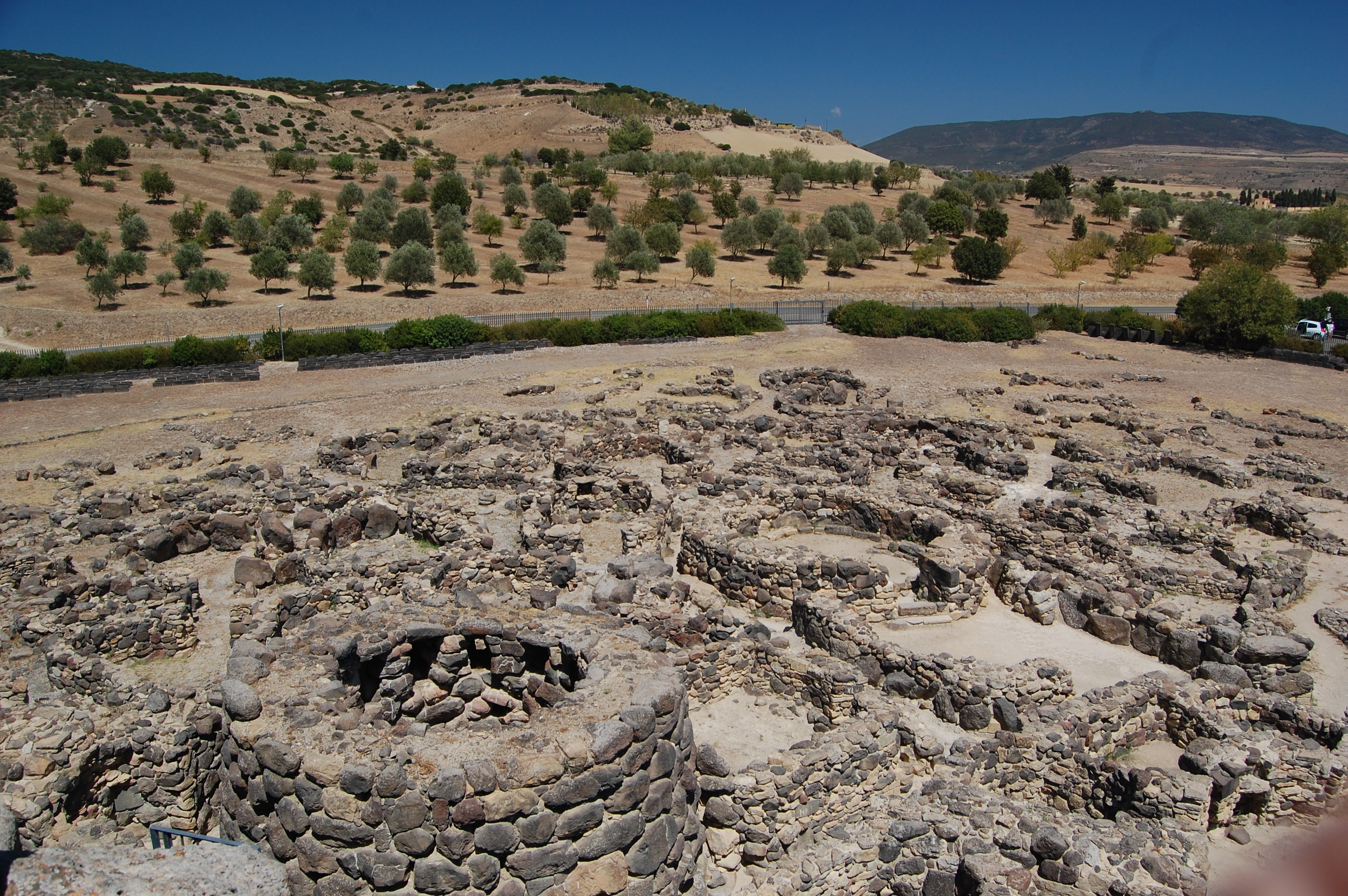
The village

A village, intended to accommodate the surrounding population, was built around the Nuraghe in the Late Bronze Age. The many phases of life in the village render it impossible to establish the number of huts in one phase, the number of huts varied from forty to two hundred, so the population ranged from 100 to 1000 inhabitants and the settlement was built on a circular plan with large boulders covered with dry stone walls and conical roofs made of wood and branches. Though the huts were structured in a single unit in more remote periods, there was a later, more prevalent tendency to subdivide housing into individual units. Of the huts found, the most significant appear to have been reserved for meetings of the local leaders. These huts were larger and more complex in structure, and the hut reserved for the inhabitants' meetings contained symbols of the deities worshiped by locals. Other rooms have been identified as workshops, kitchens, and agricultural processing centres. During the 9-8th century BC a sewerage system was built along with a paved square and streets.

During the sixth century BCE, the buildings were destroyed and subsequently restored by Carthage before being occupied by the Romans. They were eventually completely abandoned.

The nuraghe and the village were strategically connected to the system of other Nuraghes, such as the polylobate nuraghe found beneath the fifteenth-century Palazzo Zapata in the village of Barumini.

== Archaeological excavations ==
The archaeological site was fully excavated between 1950 and 1957 under the direction of Giovanni Lilliu, a local expert. The excavations allowed archaeologists to retrace the different stages of the construction of the towers and surrounding village, confirming that the entire complex was a vibrant, vital centre up to the first century BCE, during the Roman period.

Excavations brought to light important remains in the form of tools, weapons, pottery, and ornaments.

There is another important nuragic site at nearby Casa Zapata, the important finds of which are on display at the site's museum.

Plan of the Nuragic complex and village

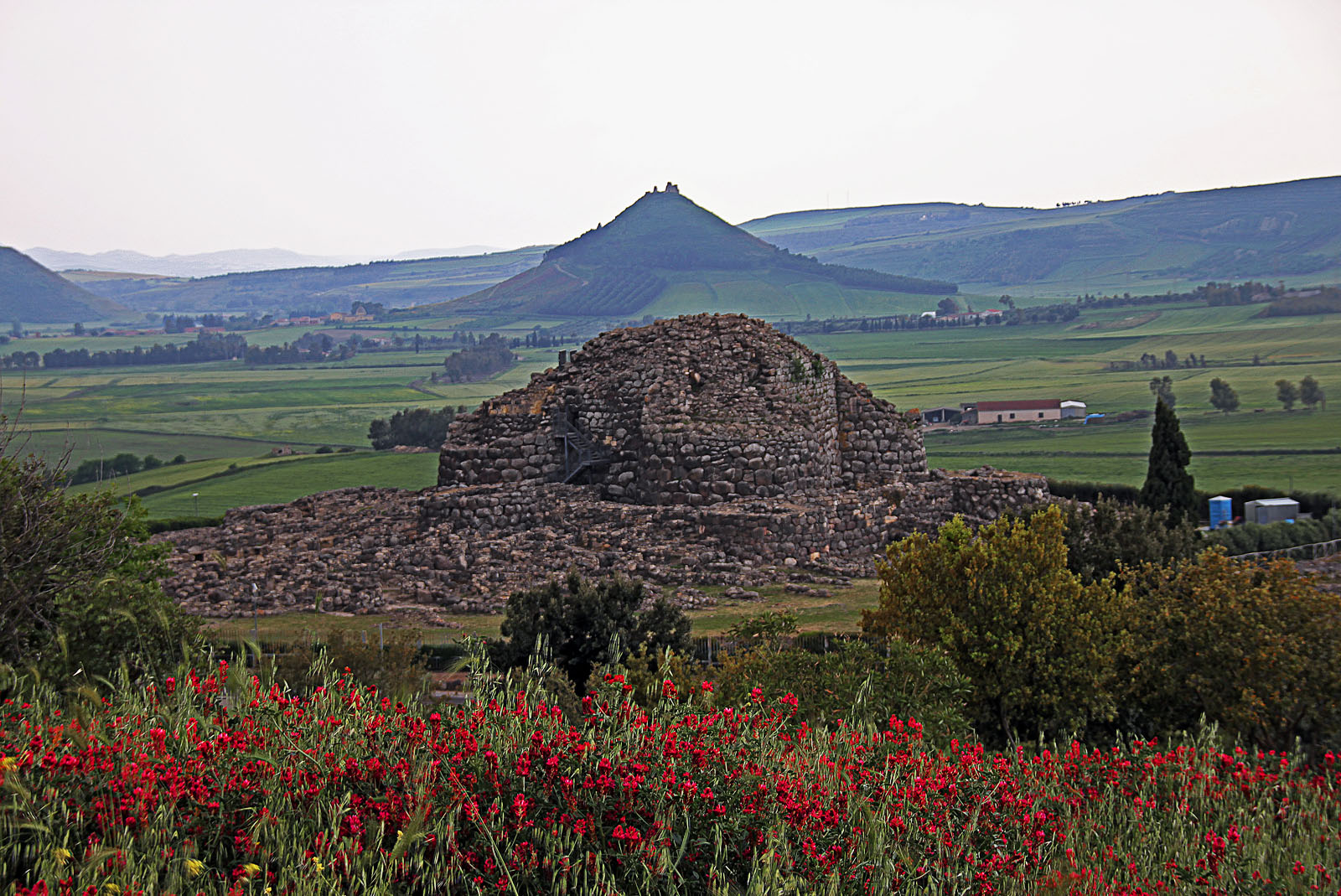
The view from the N-NE, in the background is the mound of Las Plassas

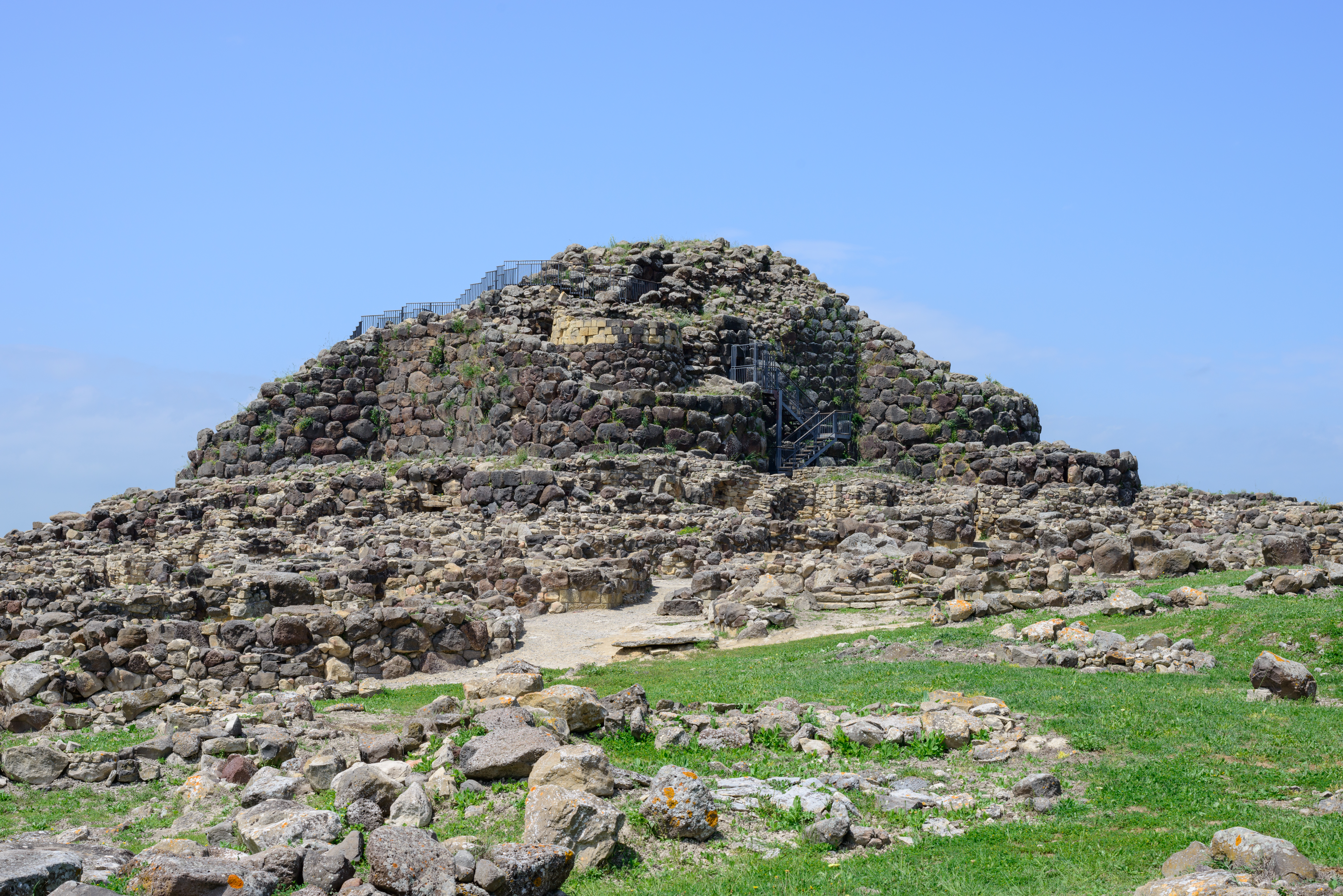

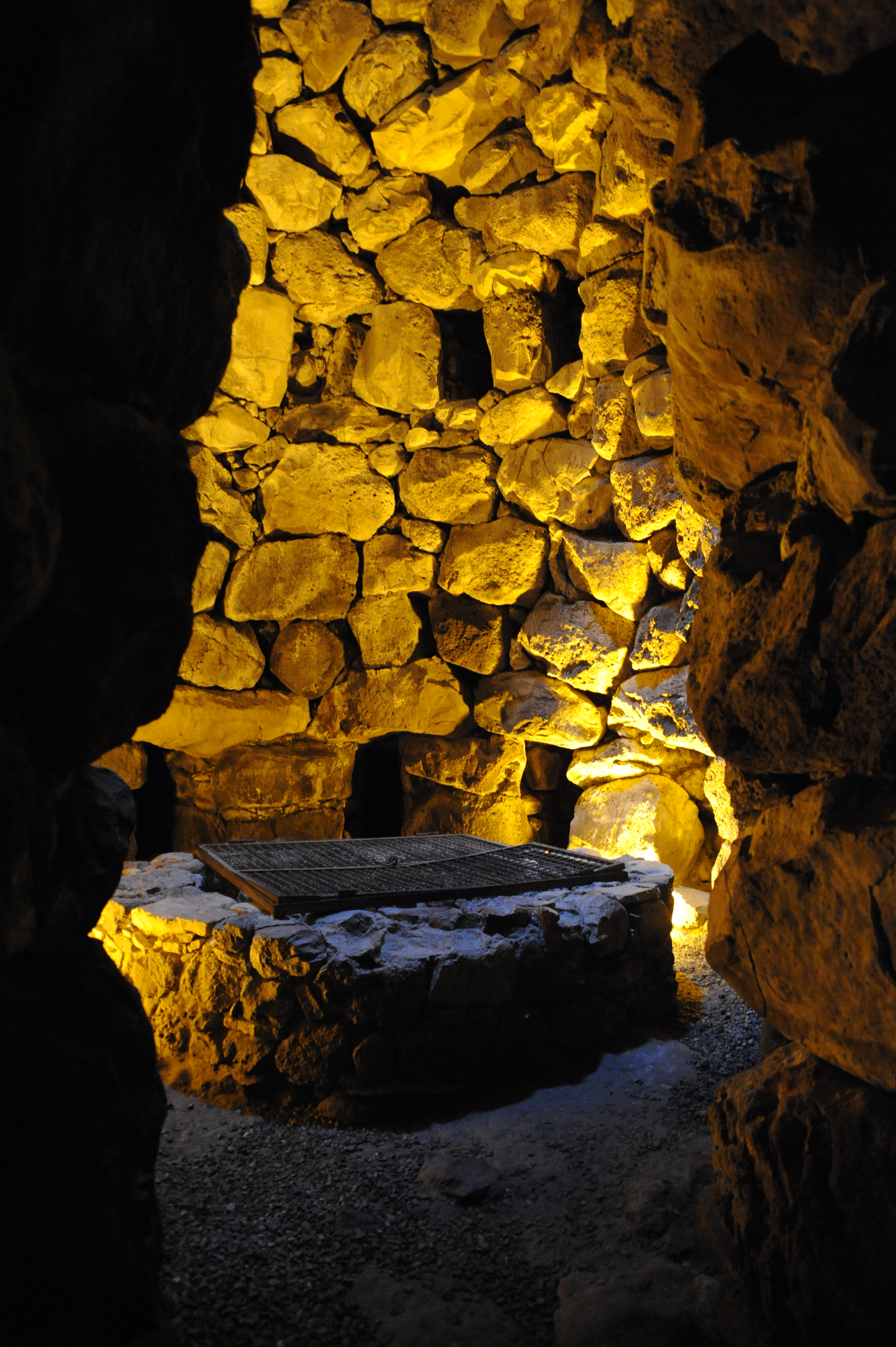

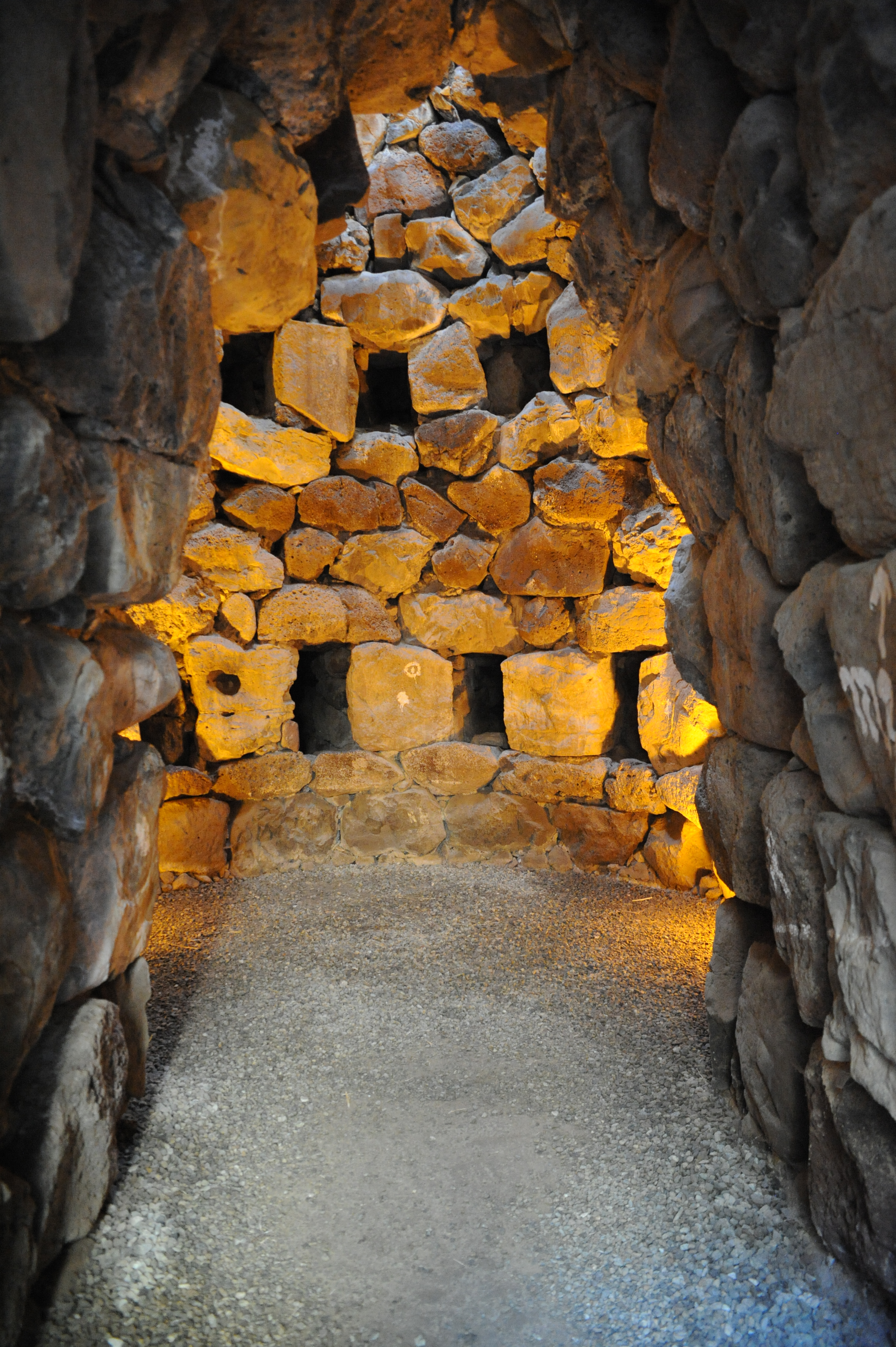

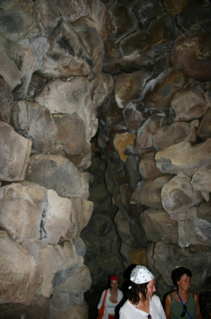
Su Nuraxi, seen on the way from the central tower to the east tower.

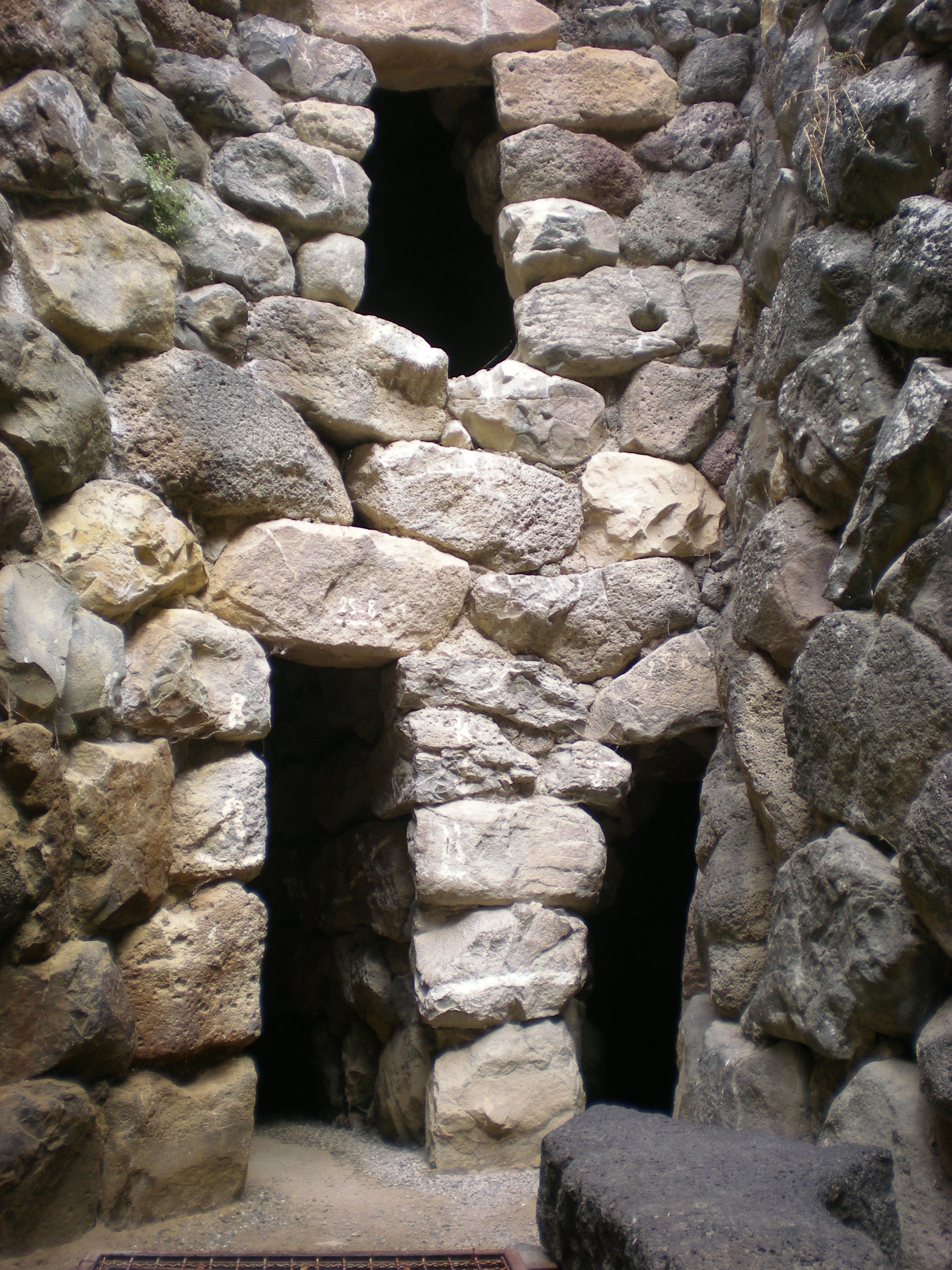
Su Nuraxi. Inside the central tower.

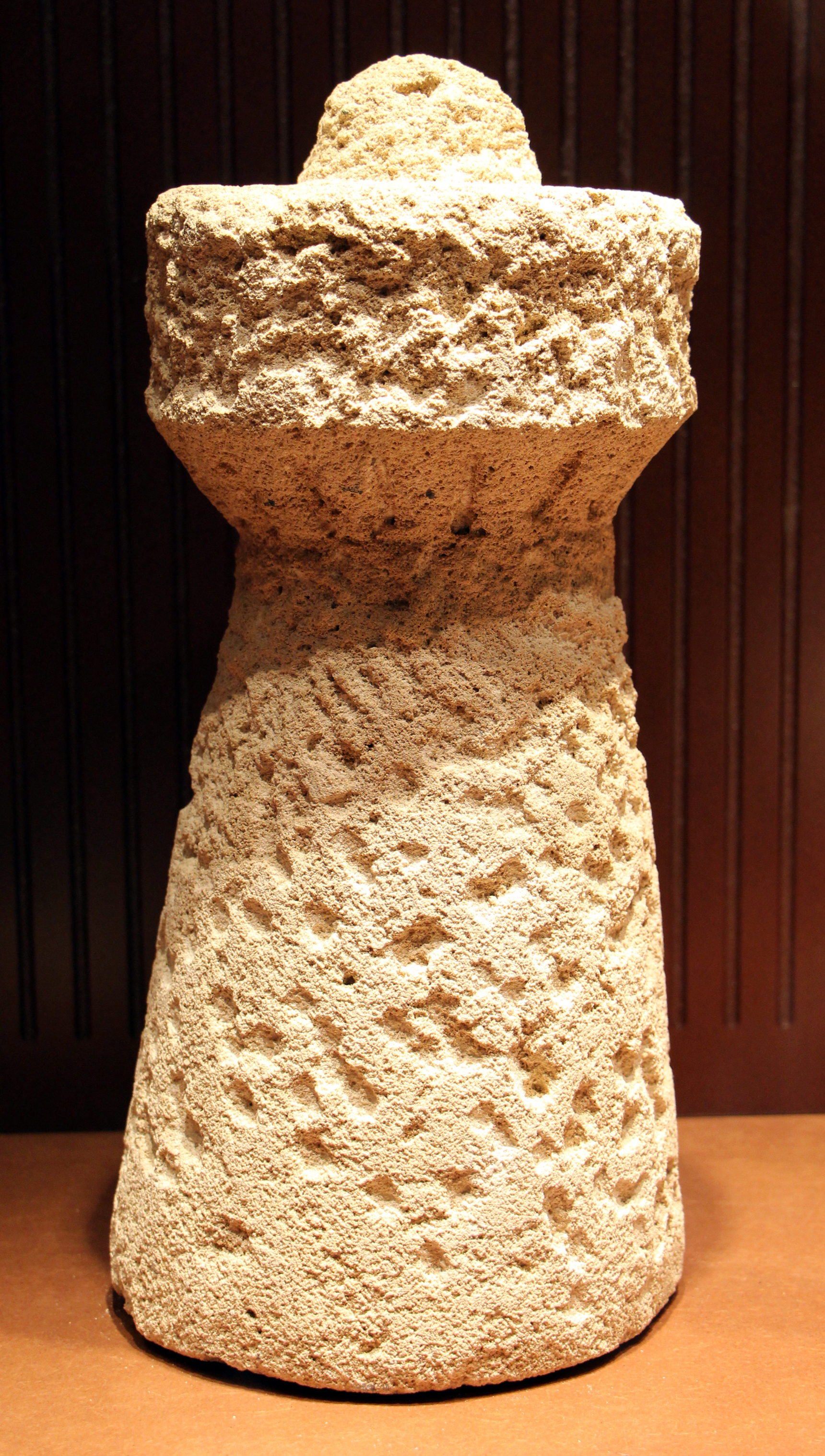
Stone model of a nuraghe from Su Nuraxi

== Bibliography ==
- Dyson Stephen L., Rowland Robert J. (2007). Shepherds, sailors, & conquerors - Archeology and History in Sardinia from the Stone Age to the Middle Ages. Philadelphia: University of Pennsylvania, Museum of Archeology and Anthropology. ISBN 978-1-934536-02-5.
- Sardegna Cultura -- Barumini, Complesso di Su Nuraxi
- Giovanni Lilliu and Raimondo Zucca, Su Nuraxi di Barumini. Sassari, Carlo Delfino, 2001.
