= Fortezza Medicea (Volterra) =

Fortified building in Volterra, Italy

Coordinates: 43°24′00″N 10°51′51″E

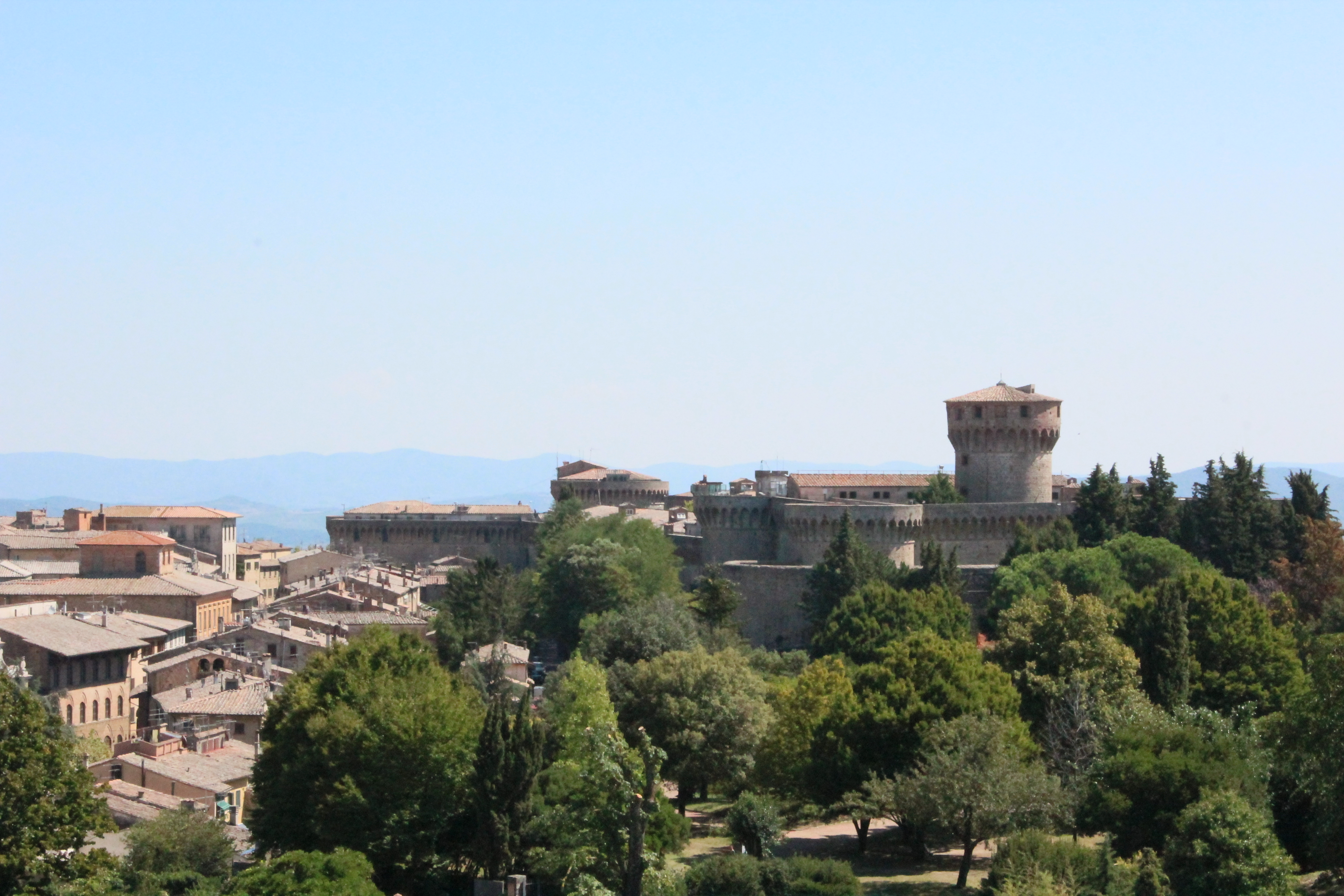
The fortress at Volterra

The Fortezza Medicea (Medici Fortress) of Volterra is built on the highest point of the hill overlooking the town.

Despite its name, the origins of the fortress predate the ascendancy of the Medicis. The southern part was constructed at the command of Walter VI, Duke of Athens, who had been appointed governor of Florence in 1342.

Over more than a century the once friendly relationship between Volterra and Florence became increasingly complicated and at times confrontational: the discovery locally of valuable alum in the 1470s focused the interest of Florence, and in 1472, some 7,000 Florentine troops besieged and sacked the town, after which Florentine control over Volterra and the alum mines was no longer in doubt. The fortress was upgraded by another Florentine ruler, Lorenzo the Magnificent, who was also responsible for the construction of the adjacent newer fortress in 1474.

The two fortresses are linked by a stone “curtain wall”. The fortress is now used as a medium security prison and tourist visits to the interior are restricted to a few days and a small portion of the buildings. A notable exception is that part is used for a restaurant operated by appropriately supervised prisoners.
