= Augusta Maywood =

American ballerina

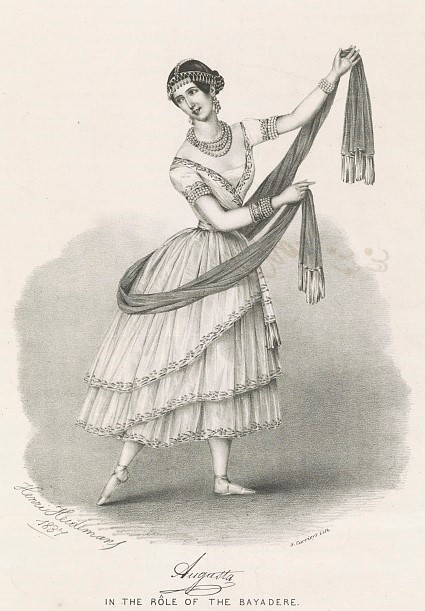
- Augusta Maywood
- Born: March 5, 1825; New York City
- Died: November 3, 1876; Lviv
- Occupations: Dancer, dance teacher, educator, ballet master

Augusta Maywood (March 5, 1825 – November 3, 1876), born Augusta Williams, was the first American ballerina to gain international recognition. In a career spanning forty-four years, she danced at the Paris Opera and became prima ballerina at both the Teatro Nacional de São Carlos in Lisbon and La Scala in Milan. Maywood was the first ballerina to have her own touring ensemble company.

== Early life and education ==
Augusta Williams was born in New York City on March 5, 1825. She was the second of two daughters born to Henry August Williams and Martha Bally, itinerant actors from England who divorced when Augusta was an infant. When Augusta was three, her mother remarried Robert Campbell Maywood, an actor who also managed the Chestnut Street Theatre. Both Augusta and her older sister Mary Elizabeth took their stepfather's last name.

In 1836, her stepfather arranged for her to take ballet lessons with Paul H. Hazard, a Philadelphia instructor who had danced with the Paris Opera.

== Dancing career ==
On December 30, 1837, Maywood made her stage debut at age twelve in a benefit for her mother, a performance of The Maid of Cashmere, a version of Daniel Auber's opera ballet Le Dieu et la bayadère. Philadelphia newspapers reported that the performance had caused "a sensation among the veteran playgoers," and critics lauded her performance, including one who was "astonished by her excellence." Theater historian Charles Durang wrote it was "a most extraordinary debut. Perhaps for the brief tuition that the little goddess underwent, and correlative non-advantages surrounding her, this was a first appearance unprecedented in ballet annals." One of the other dancers at that performance caught the attention of critics: Mary Ann Lee, another protégée of Paul Hazard. A rivalry between the two girls was encouraged by the public, the press, and Maywood's stepfather.

In February 1838, Maywood traveled to New York City to perform the Le Dieu et la bayadère at the Park Theatre. A review in The Albion wrote: "Though scarcely twelve years of age there was a precision, a strength and even a force, in her dancing, such as we do not ordinarily see in any but practiced danseuses of mature age." The Mirror wrote, "Philadelphia has covered herself with glory in borrowing this native-born sprite of New York for a season, and returning her so rich in attractions to the home of her childhood... Her bright, pretty elfish face and ariel-like figure, the mingled grace and precision of her movements, and above all the wonderful muscular powers she displays for a child of twelve, can hardly be overrated in their attractions; while as a mere actress, her versatility of expression, both of feature and gesture, and her winning archness and finished byplay, impart to her performance a charm infinitely beyond her years." The next month Maywood appeared together with Lee in The Dew Drop, or La Sylphide, a version of La Sylphide by Taglioni. She performed in a successful benefit in New York City on April 7.

=== Move to Europe ===
In May 1838, Maywood traveled with her mother to Paris; she would never return to the United States. She studied under Jean Coralli and Joseph Mazilier, the ballet master and principal dancer at the Académie Royale de Musique (the Paris Opéra). Charles de Boigne described her as a high-spirited child who shocked the other students out of their complacency.

She made her Paris debut at age fourteen in November 1839 in Coralli's Le Diable boiteux. The response to her debut was positive; Théophile Gautier referred to her as an "infant prodigy" and reviews described her dancing as "original," "eccentric," and "astonishing." Much was made of the fact that she was born in the New World, with Parisian reviewers describing her as a "wild doe" or a "lively gazelle." Two weeks later she performed in her second debut La Tarentule, a two-act ballet-pantomime, alongside Fanny Elssler. Her third debut performance at the Paris Opéra was in December 1839 with an appearance in La Gypsy, a full-length ballet-pantomime with choreography by Mazilier. That month she was offered a contract for an appointment at the Opéra, for a generous annual sum of 3,000 livres.

Maywood danced with older and more experienced dancers in her performances, and was considered an artist to watch in the future. In 1840 she danced in Gustave III (Auber), Fernand Cortez, La muette de Portici, La fille mal gardée, and Le Diable amoureux. Her time at the Academie was cut short, however, when she eloped to Lisbon in November 1840 with her dancing partner, Charles Mabille. The elopement made headlines on both sides of the Atlantic; the Spirit of the Times described Maywood as "the fugitive diablesse" in reference to the most recent ballet they had danced in together. They were both removed from the payroll as they had missed performances.

Maywood's family returned to the United States after Maywood married, but she remained in Europe. There is no record of Maywood performing in 1842, as she was likely pregnant and giving birth to a baby girl. She would spend the next five years dancing in venues in smaller cities such as Marseille and Lyon. For the 1843-1845 seasons, at age eighteen, she was prima ballerina at the Teatro Nacional de São Carlos in Lisbon. Her debut in Giselle received rave reviews.

From 1845 to 1847, she danced at the Theater am Kärntnertor with her husband. But their relationship was troubled, and by 1845 Maywood had returned to using her maiden name. They divorced and she abandoned her infant daughter to the care of her ex-husband.

=== Fame in Italy ===
Maywood's growing renown at Vienna gained her an invitation to perform at La Scala in Milan in 1848. At La Scala, Maywood became the prima ballerina at age twenty-three. She continued to perform there until her retirement in 1862. She danced the ballerina role in operas such as Jules Perrot's Faust and Antonio Cortesi's La silfide.

Maywood became the first ballerina to tour with her own ensemble company, joining with the Lasina brothers, Giovanni Battista and Giuseppi, to create a semi-permanent ensemble. She toured Italy with the company from 1850 to 1858, performing in ballet versions of Harriet Beecher Stowe's Uncle Tom's Cabin and Filippo Termanini's Rita Gauthier. A marionette version of her 1852 production of Il sogno di un alchimista was created by the Teatro Mecanico of the Anfiteatro Goldoni, marking her as a part of Italian theater culture.

She was frequently critiqued by the press for scandalous behavior, including her elopement, divorce, abandonment of her child, and allegedly leaving her stepfather to die in a poorhouse. In 1858 she married Carlo Gardini, an Italian physician and journalist.

After retiring in 1862, she opened a ballet school in Vienna. She later returned to northern Italy in 1873, where she lived on Lake Como. Maywood died in obscurity on November 3, 1876, in Lemberg, Austria-Hungary (later Lviv, Ukraine).
