= Aurelia Dimier =

French Ballet dancer

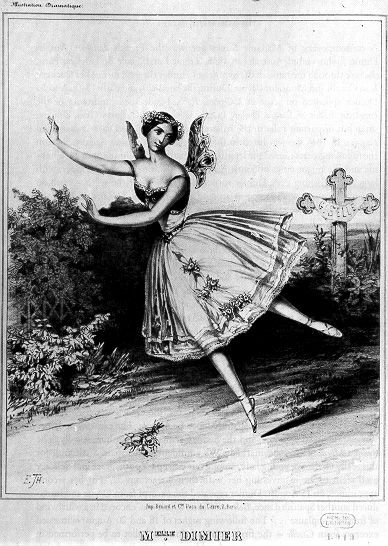
- Mlle Dimier in Giselle, act two.
- Born: Aurelia Dimier; August 22, 1827; Paris, France
- Died: Chile
- Other names: Madame Dimier; Mademoiselle Dimier
- Occupation: Ballet dancer

Aurelia Dimier, known professionally as Mlle Dimier, was a French ballet dancer.

== Early life ==
Aurelia Dimier was born in Paris, France on August 22, 1827.

== Entertainment life ==
Aurelia's stage name was Mademoiselle Dimier (or Mlle Dimier). Dimier was engaged in her studies and dance performances in Paris during the years 1836 to 1846. Studying at the Paris Opera Ballet School, she ascended through the corps de ballet under Jean Coralli and Jean-Baptiste Barrez. In the late 1830s and early 1840s, she took the stage at the Paris Opera with distinguished dancers such as Fanny Elssler, Lucille Grahn, and Carlotta Grisi. In the mid-1840s, Dimier performed at the Paris Opera in the ballet Paquita with choreographic work by Joseph Mazilier. She engaged in other supporting roles and played a small part of Giselle, a romantic ballet. After the expiration of her contract, she accepted an offer from M. Fréderick to tour in the United States.

On February 2, 1846, she debuted in America with a role in the New York City premiere of Giselle. Her debut appearance at Burton's Theatre featured Mlle Augusta, Madame Céleste, Mons Fréderick, and Mr. B. Yates, and the performance ran for eleven nights. During that year, Dimier also performed in the ballet Pas de Bouquet.

In February 1847, Mlle Dimier joined Mlle Augusta and Mons Fréderick for performances in Washington. However, by April of that year in New Orleans, reports indicated that Mlle Dimier and Mlle Augusta would no longer continue their partnership on stage. On October 20, 1847, Mlle Dimier secured a brief engagement and performed for eight nights with Mlle Fanny Mautin, Mons Schmidt, Mr. Charles, and Miss Kennerly.

After returning to France, she embarked on a South American tour, debuting in Chile on December 18, 1850, before traveling to Peru, California, and Australia. In 1855, Dimier visited in Australia and had been performing at the Royal Victoria Theatre. In Sydney, Dimier starred in the leading role in Le Diable à quatre. Dimier was a contemporary of Madame Strebinger and Lola Montes. When Lola Montes departed the U.S. to tour Australia in 1855, it interfered with Aurelia Dimier's season. Shortly thereafter, Aurelia exited to Melbourne's Olympic Theatre eventually performing the Australian premiere of Giselle.

The French dancer later established her permanent residence in Valparaíso, Chile, continuing to teach dance while also running a hotel. She established the Hotel Dimier, located in Plaza del Orden (now known as Aníbal Pinto Square).

== Death ==
Mlle Dimier died in Chile in the 19th century.

== Gallery ==
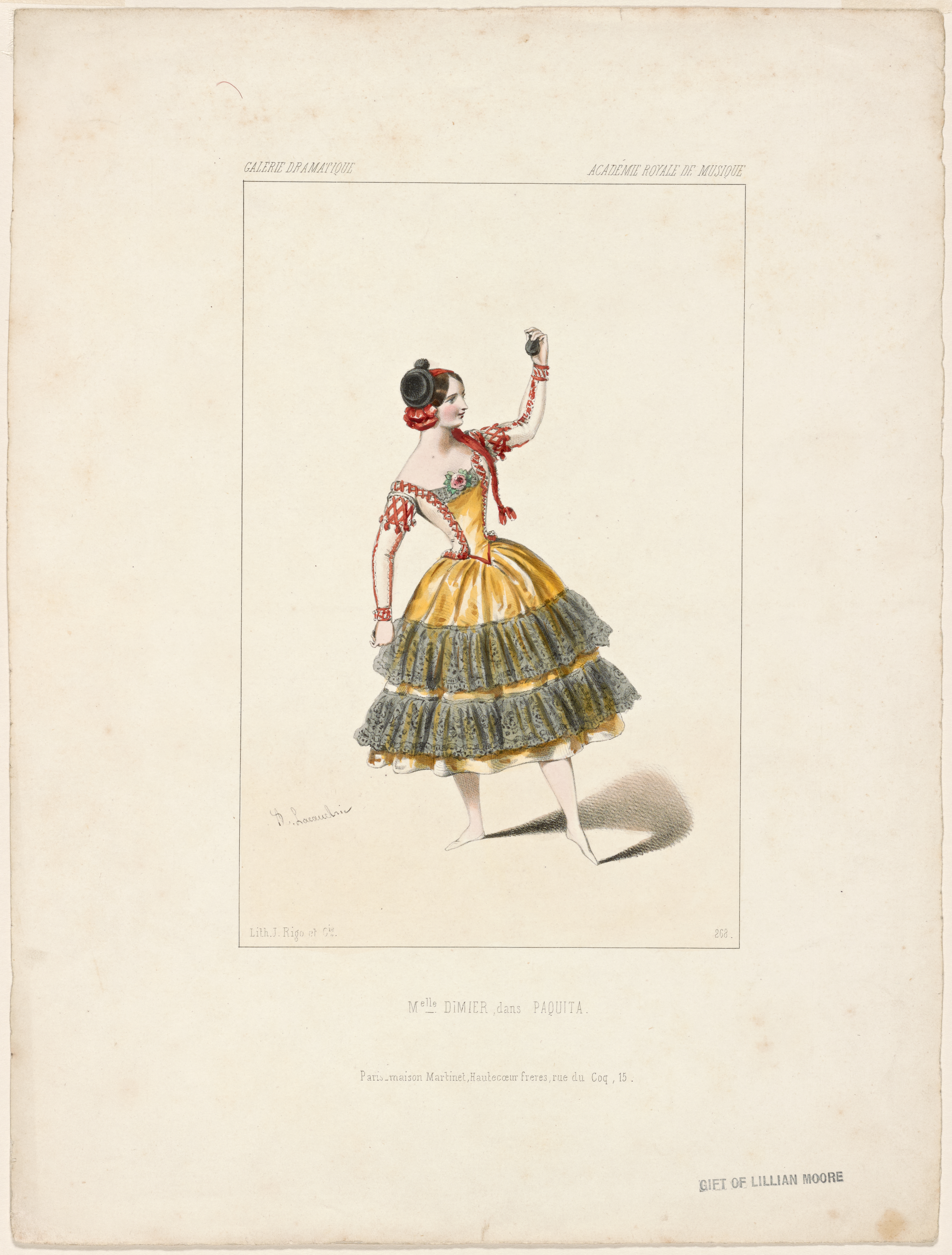
Mlle Dimier in Paquita
