= Mary Ann Lee =

American ballerina (1824-1899)

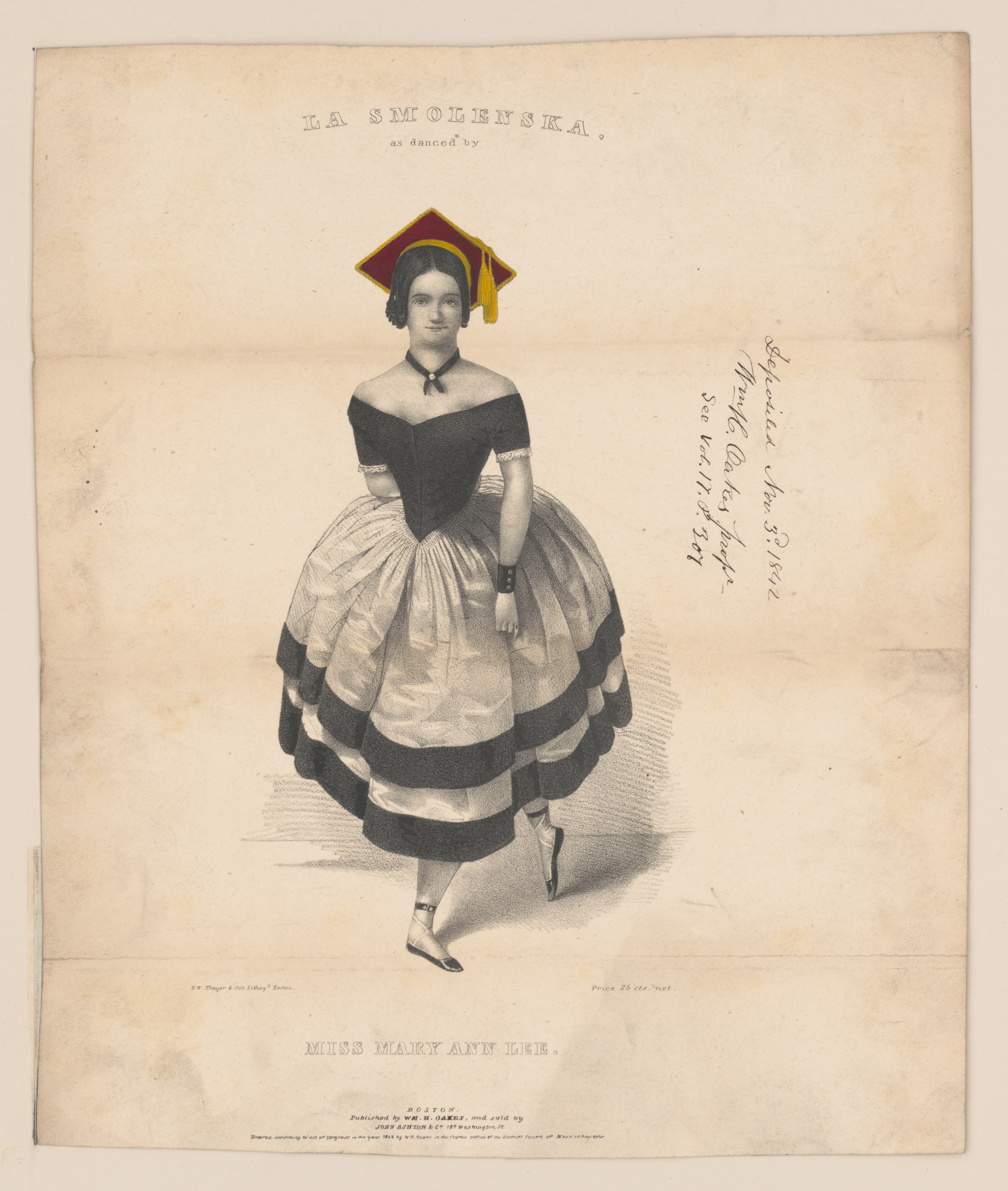
- Born: c. July 1824; Philadelphia Pennsylvania, U.S.
- Died: January 25, 1899; Philadelphia, Pennsylvania, U.S.
- Resting place: Laurel Hill Cemetery, Philadelphia, Pennsylvania, U.S.
- Known for: ballerina

Mary Ann Lee (c. July 1824–January 25, 1899) was an American ballerina from Philadelphia. She was one of the first American ballerinas and her 10-year career included the first American performance of Giselle in Boston in 1846.

== Early life and education ==
She was born circa July 1824 in Philadelphia, Pennsylvania to theatrical parents Charles and Wilhelmena Lee. Her father was a performer on stage and in the circus. Her mother danced in the ensemble at the Chestnut Street Theatre in Philadelphia. As a child, Lee took small acting parts in stage performances at the Chestnut Theatre.

== Career ==
She trained in Philadelphia with Paul Hazard of the Paris Opéra. She was one of America's first ballerinas and made her ballet debut as Fatima in 1837 in The Maid of Cashmere at the Chestnut Street Theatre in the same production as Augusta Maywood. The audiences were enthusiastic about both performers and encouraged a rivalry between the two dancers. Both dancers also performed in a production of The Dew Drop, or La Sylphide in March 1838. Maywood moved to Europe to study dance and Lee remained in Philadelphia. Lee first danced as Zelica in La Bayadere on April 27, 1839, and it remained a favorite throughout her career.

Lee studied in New York City with James Sylvain, and made her New York debut in June 1839 at the Bowery Theatre. She did more than just dance and acted in melodramas and other stage works. In the summer of 1840, she was one of the performers in P.T. Barnum's Vauxhall Garden. She toured the United States, then studied with Ballet Master Jean Coralli in Paris. She returned to the United States in 1845 and performed at the Arch Street Theatre in Philadelphia. She brought an improved technique for her performances including La fille du Danube. She danced the first American performance of Giselle in Boston in 1846.

Lee danced and toured with George Washington Smith. She retired in 1847 at age 24 for health reasons. She married William Vanhook, a Philadelphia merchant. The couple had three children. She made a few returns to the stage, and taught dance in later life. She died in Philadelphia on January 25, 1899, and was interred in Laurel Hill Cemetery.
