= Friedrich Horschelt =

Friedrich Horschelt may refer to:

- Friedrich Horschelt (dancer) (1793–1876), German ballet master and impresario
- Friedrich Horschelt (painter) (1824–1881), German portrait painter
