= Pauline Duvernay =

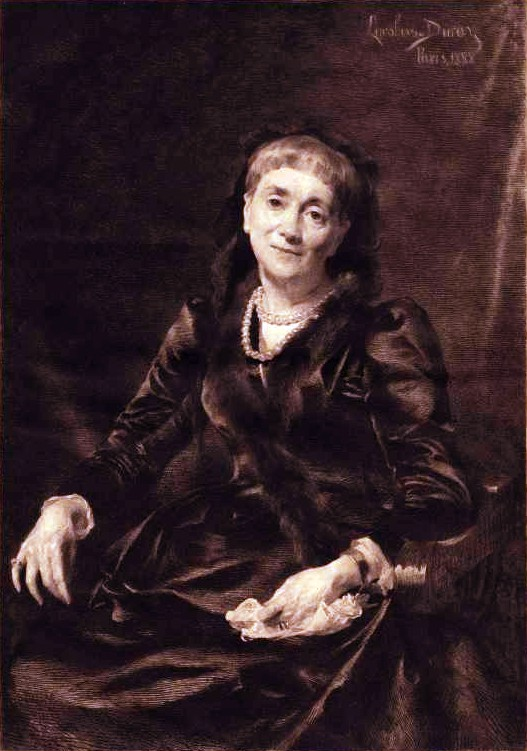
Portrait by Carolus-Duran of Pauline Duvernay, 1888.

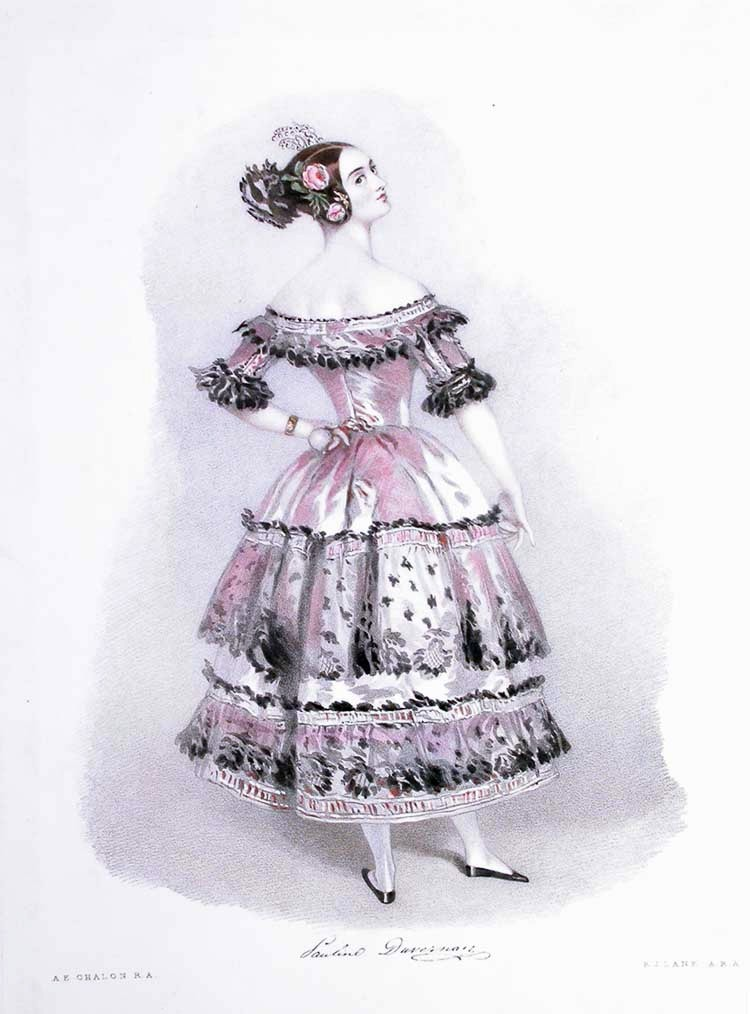
Portrait by Richard James Lane of Pauline Duvernay in the celebrated La Cachucha from Jean Coralli's 1836 ballet Le Diable boiteux.

Pauline Duvernay or Yolande Marie-Louise Duvernay or Yolande Marie Louise de Varnay (December 1812 – 2 September 1894) was a French dancer.

== Biography ==
Pauline Duvernay was born at Versailles and became a student of Hippolyte Barrez at the Paris Opera Ballet, where she also worked with Auguste Vestris, Jean-Francois Coulon and Filippo Taglioni.

She made her debut on the stage of the Théâtre de l´Académie Royale de Musique in Paris performing Venus in Jean-Baptiste Blache's Mars et Vénus. That same year she made her debut in London at the Drury Lane Theatre in Jean-Pierre Aumer's La Belle au bois dormant ("Sleeping Beauty"). Working with the renowned Ballet du Théâtre de l´Académie Royale de Musique (today known as the Paris Opera Ballet), she also gave outstanding performances in Jean Coralli's La tentation (music by Fromental Halévy and Casimir Gide) in 1832.

Her beauty and dancing skills captivated audiences in Paris and London, and she enjoyed tremendous popularity. She retired in 1837, at the height of her career, marrying an English banker and Member of Parliament, Stephens Lyne-Stephens, thought to be the richest commoner in England at that time. Duvernay devoted herself to charity work. Stephens bought Lynford Hall near Thetford in 1856, intending to develop its 8,000 acres (32 km^{2}) with mansion house, parkland and lake as a hunting retreat, and commissioned the architect William Burn to refurbish it. His death in 1861 set off a frenzy of fortune hunters, who went so far as to tamper with their family trees in order to bolster their claims to the estate.

The fortune had been amassed by William Stephens of Cornwall, an illegitimate child born in 1731. He started a glass factory in Portugal with his brother and members of the related Lyne family. Stephens had influential political connections in Portugal, exempting his business from taxes.

A childless widow, Duvernay had a liaison with General Edward Stopford Claremont who had been the British Military Attaché to France. She lived at Lynford Hall, using her personal fortune to build the Catholic Church of Our Lady and the English Martyrs in Cambridge, St Francis of Assisi Church in Shefford, and financially assisting local schools. She died at Mundford, Norfolk, and was buried with Stephens in the Lyne-Stephens Mausoleum she had built for him.
