= Ozai =

Ozai may refer to:

- Fire Lord Ozai, a character in Avatar: The Last Airbender
- Ōzai village, Kitaamabe District, Ōita, Japan
  - Ōzai Station, Ōita, Ōita Prefecture, Japan
  - Ōzai Campus of Nippon Bunri University
- Trstenik Airport (ICAO: LYTR), also known as "Ozai", an airport in Serbia
- Ozaï; ou l'Insulaire, an 1847 ballet by Jean Coralli
