= Friedrich Albert Zorn =

German dancer and choreographer (1816–1895)

- Born: 3 April 1816; Kempten
- Died: 1 January 1895 (aged 78); Odesa

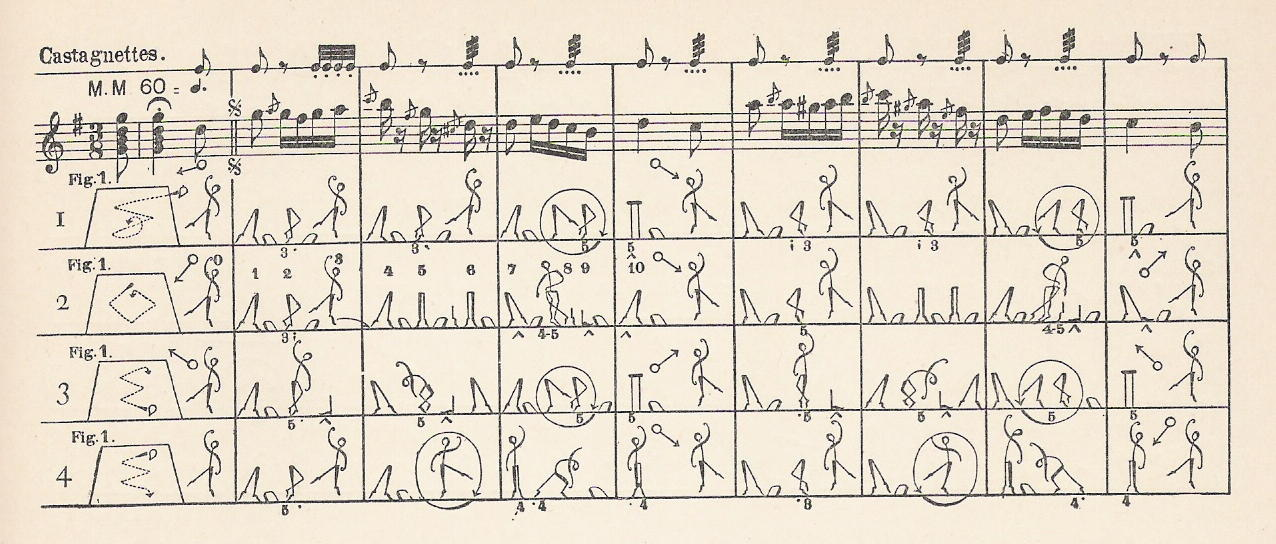
Dance score for La Cachucha, by Friedrich Albert Zorn.

Friedrich Albert Zorn (3 April 1816, Kempten – 1 January 1895, Odesa) was a German dancer, choreographer and dance theorist. He was a member of the Berlin Academy of Dance, the Society of Dance Teachers in Berlin, and the Society of Dance Teachers in Canada.

== Biography ==
He studied dance in Königsberg and Leipzig. At the age of 19, he taught dance in Dresden and Oslo.

From 1839 he lived in Odesa, where in 1840 he began teaching dancing, gymnastics, and swimming at the Richelieu Gymnasium. At the same time, he worked in four other Odesa gymnasiums and had private lessons. Later, he opened a private dance school located at 12 Politseiska Street.

In 1887, in Leipzig, he published the Grammatik der Tanzkunst, in which he described a system of dance notation inspired by Arthur Saint-Léon. Based on many years of research and discussions with Paul Taglioni and Saint-Léon, Zorn's theories were taken up by several German students, and his work was translated into English in 1905.

Zorn describes, in particular, Auguste Vestris's gavotte, as well as the La Cachucha, which was danced by Fanny Elssler and Jean Coralli in the ballet Le Diable boiteux in 1836.
