= Mlle Augusta =

German ballet dancer (1806-1901)

Mademoiselle Augusta
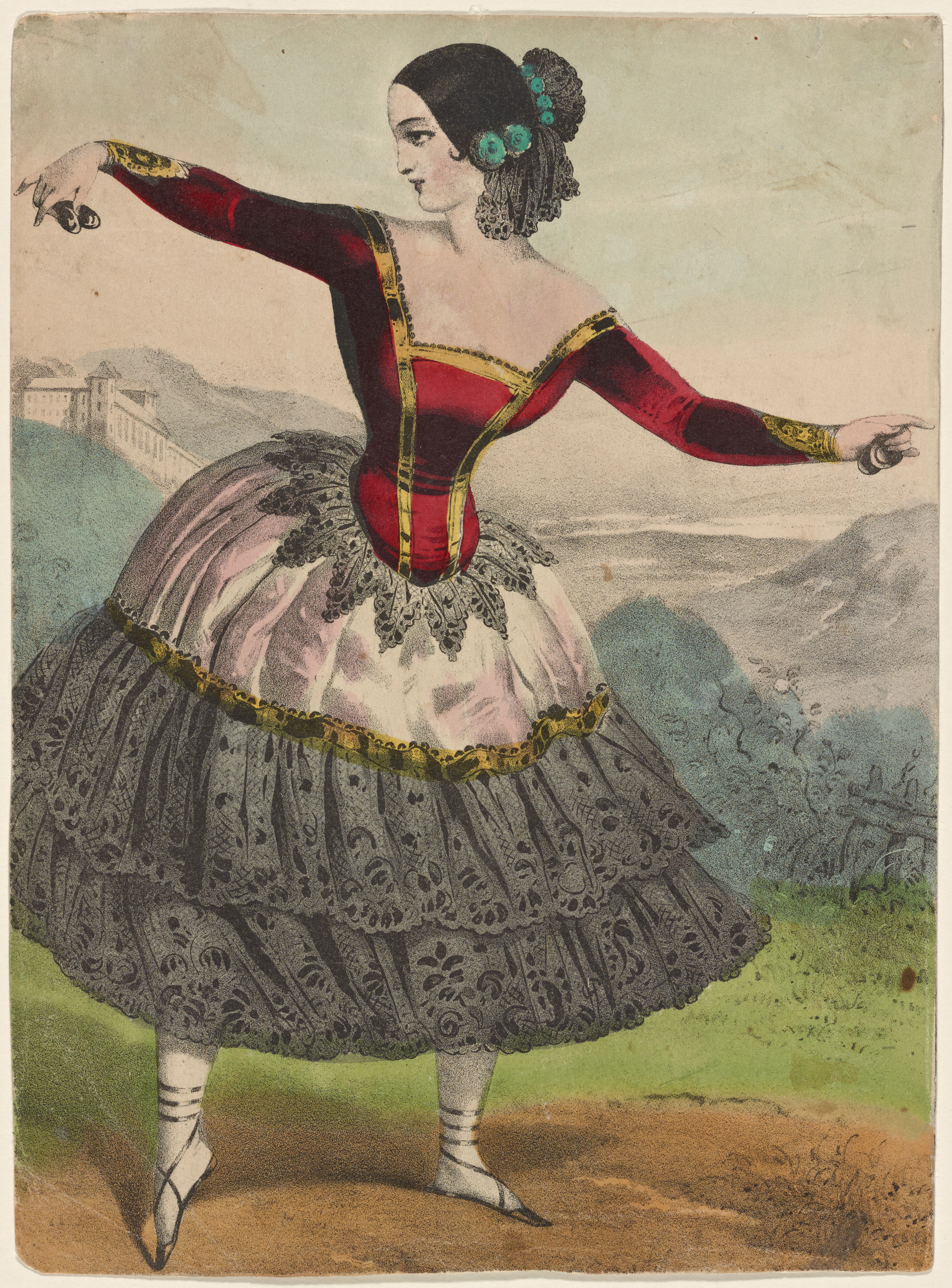
- Born: Caroline Augusta Josephine Thérèse Fuchs; September 17, 1806; Munich, Germany
- Died: February 17, 1901 (aged 94); New York City, New York, United States
- Other names: Madame Augusta; Mlle Augusta; Caroline Augusta Fuchs
- Occupation: Ballet dancer

Caroline Augusta Josephine Thérèse Fuchs (September 17, 1806 – February 17, 1901), known professionally as Mlle Augusta, was a German ballet dancer.

== Early life ==
Caroline Augusta Josephine Thérèse Fuchs was born in Munich, Germany on September 17, 1806.

She later married a Frenchman who styled himself the Count of St. James and claimed descent from the House of Stuart, thus she became known as the Countess of Saint-James.

== Entertainment life ==
Mademoiselle Augusta (or Mlle Augusta) was the stage name of Caroline Augusta Fuchs.

Fuchs began her professional career in Brussels, Belgium. She performed in La muette de Portici around 1830 and La Sylphilde. Mlle Augusta studied with renowned choreographers Filippo Taglioni and Albert before making her London debut at the Drury Lane Theatre in 1833. In March 1833, Mlle Augusta was cast in The Maid of Cashmere as Fatima, and performed at the Theatre Royal in a pas de deux with Pauline Duvernay. Following this, she took the stage at the Opéra de Paris in 1835.

Arriving from Europe, Fuchs reached the United States in 1836. Her American debut was in a scene from the ballet of Les Naiades at Park Theatre on September 16, 1836. Her pas seul performance was met with enthusiasm, and she soon became a popular draw. Performing La bayadère at New York's Park Theatre in November 1836, Mlle Augusta received reviews that surpassed those of her contemporary, Madame Céleste. During her U.S. tour, she found success with La Sylphide in 1838. That same year, she performed in The Maid of Cashmere in Philadelphia.

On November 4, 1845, following a lengthy absence, Mlle Augusta re-appeared in La bayadère upon her return from Europe. She was cast as New York City's first "Giselle" in the romantic ballet of Giselle, or The Wilis on February 2, 1846. Mlle Augusta's appearance at Burton's Theatre featured Aurelia Dimier (making her debut), Madame Céleste (la petite), Mons Fréderick, and Mr. B. Yates, and the performance ran for eleven nights. Throughout the mid-to-late 1840s, she starred in Giselle before taking on the role of Urielle in Le Diable amoureux, and on July 4, 1850, she produced the ballet Nathalie. Mlle Augusta concluded her career in 1851 at Burton's Theatre in New York, later hosting a complimentary benefit in memory of her husband, who died in 1855. In 1880, it was noted that she was instructing dance in New York City.

== Death ==
Mlle Augusta died in New York City, New York, United States on February 17, 1901.

== Gallery ==
Madame Augusta in the Cachucha

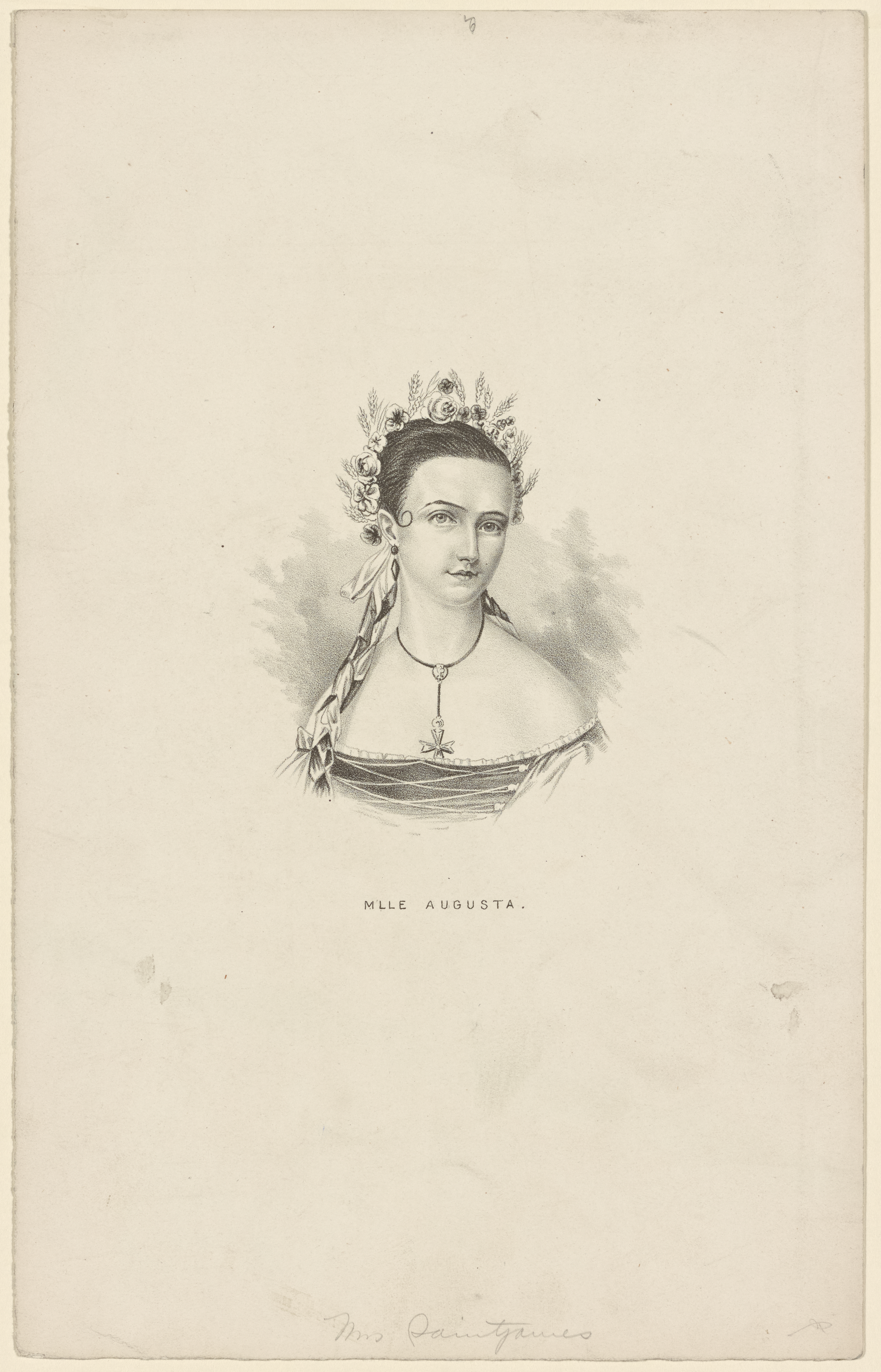
Portrait of Mlle Augusta

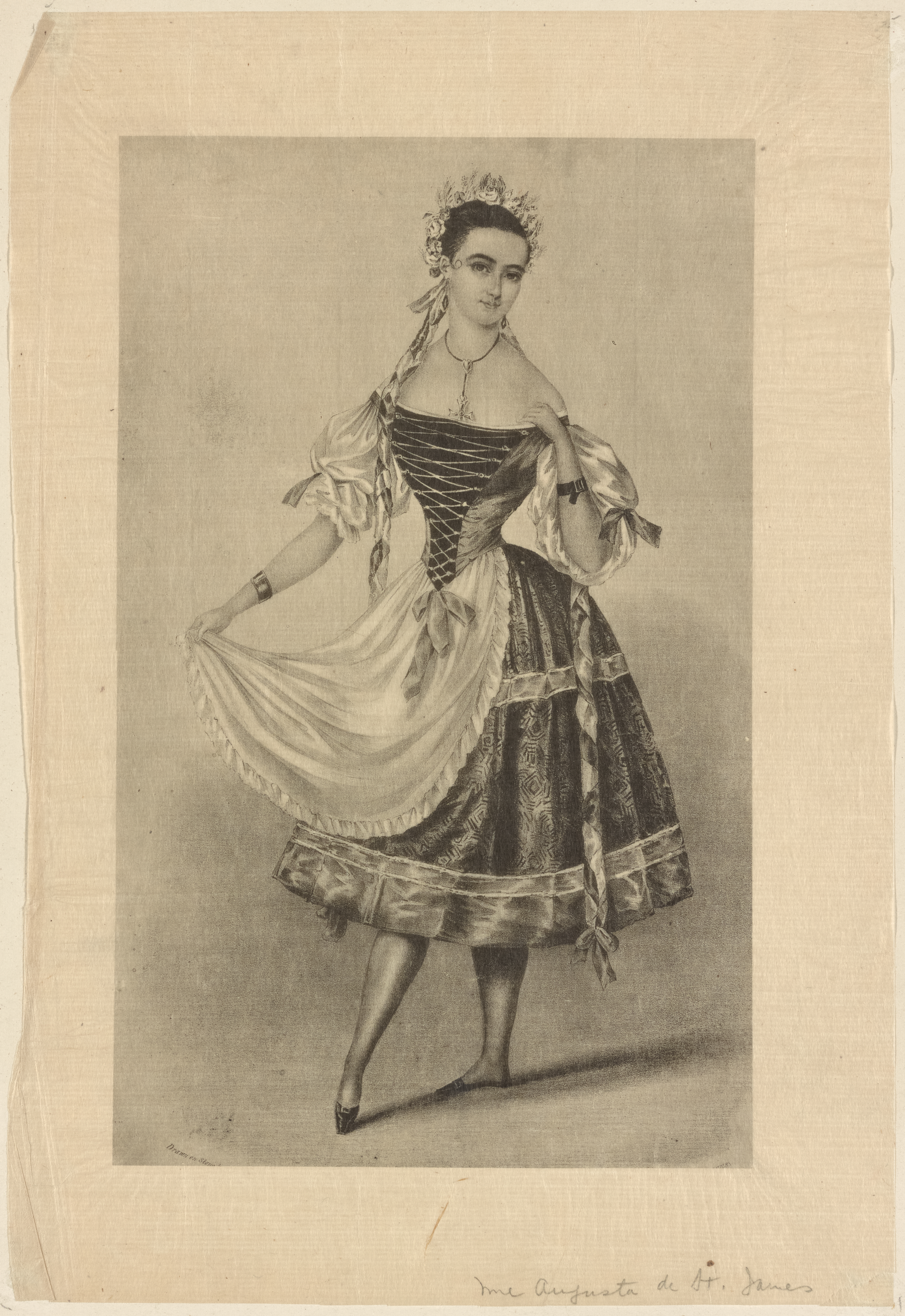
Mlle Augusta, c. 1840
