= Aplomb =

Stability during a vertical pose or movement

A dancer exhibits aplomb while performing fouettés

In classical ballet, aplomb (French pronunciation: [aplɔ̃]) refers to an unwavering stability maintained during a vertical pose or movement. The word is of French origin, with "aplomb" meaning "perpendicularity", literally "according to the plummet".

French ballet master Jean-Étienne Despréaux used the term in 1806 to refer to the dynamic balancing that is fundamental to all well-executed ballet positions and movements. In 1887, German dance theorist Friedrich Albert Zorn analogized aplomb in dancers as "the sureness of touch of the pianist". Friedrich Zorn described aplomb in terms of both its outward appearance and its underlying technique, saying that "[a]plomb is the absolute safety in rising and falling back which results from the perpendicular attitude of the upper body and the artistic placing of the feet. By means of aplomb the dancer acquires a precision and an elegance which ensure the successful execution of every foot-movement, however artistic and difficult, and thereby creates a pleasing and a satisfactory impression upon the observer." According to Agrippina Vaganova, aplomb relies on balance and on feeling and controlling the muscular sensations within the spine.
