= Casimir Gide =

French composer, bookseller and editor

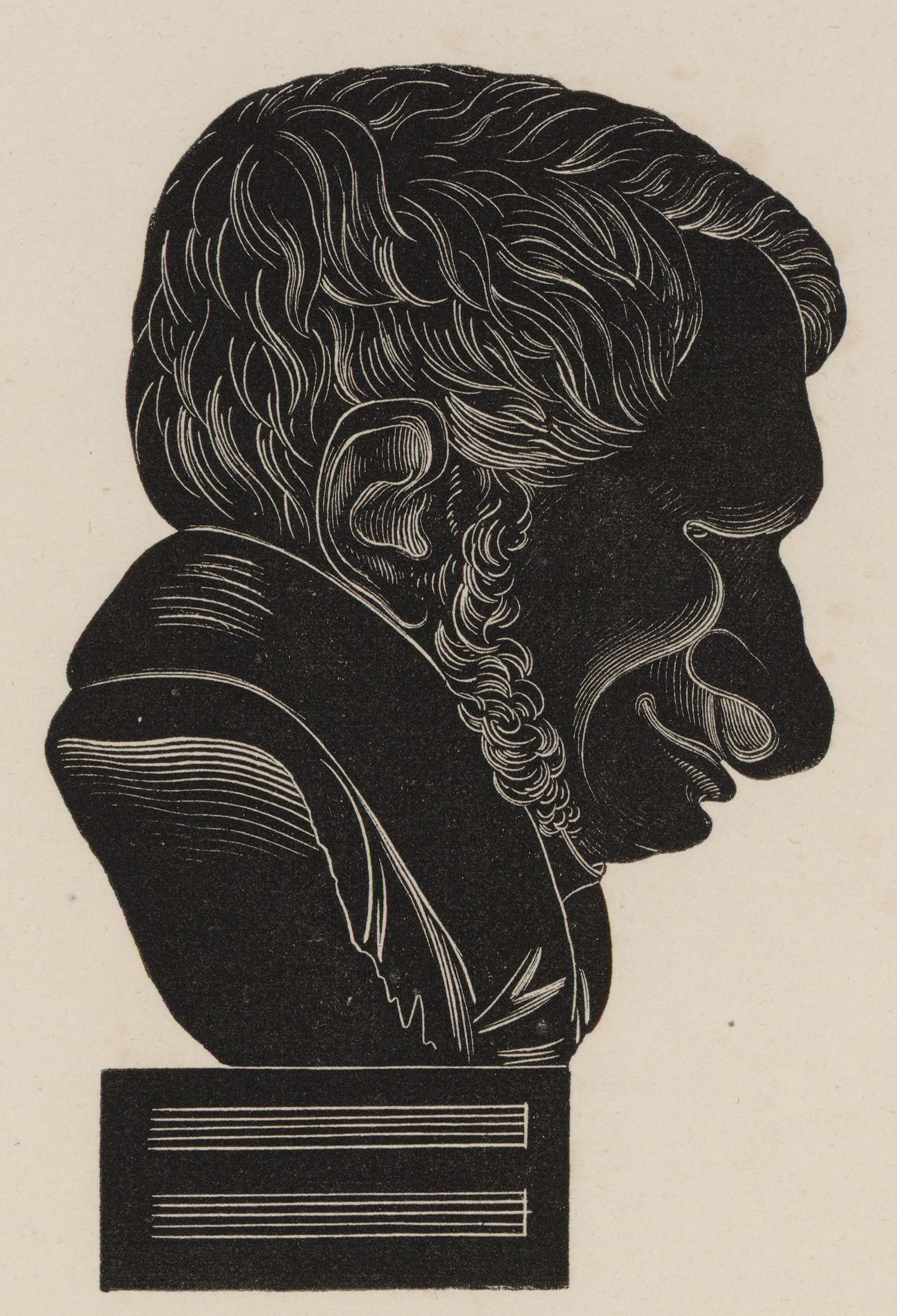
- Casimir Gide
- Born: 4 July 1804; Paris
- Died: 18 February 1868 (aged 63)
- Occupations: Composer, bookseller, prints editor

Casimir Gide (4 July 1804 – 18 February 1868) was a 19th-century French composer, bookseller as well as prints and maps editor.

== Biography ==
The son of the Parisian bookseller Theophile Etienne Gide (1768–1837), to whom he would succeed, and of a singer in the chapel of the king, he studied harmony and musical composition at the Conservatoire de Paris. On 4 February 1833, he received the bookseller patent from the Maison Gide fils. He was a major printer of lithographs and financed the publication of six volumes, among them nineteen of the Voyages pittoresques et romantiques dans l'ancienne France by Charles Nodier and Justin Taylor. In 1854, he was one of the first to launch the trend of salon operettas and artistic evenings.

== Works ==
He wrote incidental music, ballets and operas.

=== Shows ===
- 1828: Les Trois Marie, vaudeville by Louis Duport, chant and accompagnement
- 1829: La Cachucha
- 1830: La Chatte blanche
- 1830: Les Trois Catherine, with Adolphe Adam
- 1830: Le Roi de Sicile, opéra comique in 1 act, with Frédéric Soulié
- 1831: Les Jumeaux de la Réole
- 1832: La tentation
- 1835: L'île des pirates, ballet-pantomime in 4 acts
- 1836: Le Diable boiteux, ballet pantomime in 3 acts, with Edmond Burat de Gurgy and Fanny Elssler
- 1838: La Volière ou les Oiseaux de Boccace
- 1839: La Tarentule, ballet-pantomime
- 1847: Ozaï, ballet-pantomime in 2 acts, with Jean Coralli
- Pas redoublé pour harmonie militaire
- Romance (with Horace Gide)
- 1858: Belphegor

=== Piano music ===
- Quadrille et valse (piano) for Le Diable boiteux
- rondos-fantaisies on Ozaï
- Trois quadrilles de contredanses suivis de deux valses et un galop on La Tentation (with Fromental Halévy)

== Libretti ==
- 1834: L'Angélus, opéra comique in 1 act (with Jean-Joseph Ader)
- 1845: Fragment d'un répétiteur de ballet
- Le Camélia, petite ronde pour piano sur une valse du ballet, Le Diable boiteux, Op. 102
- Le Muguet, petit rondo pour piano sur un air de danse du ballet, Le Diable boiteux
- La Tentation, opera in 5 acts, lyrics by Cavé, music by Halévy, ballets music by Gide

== Lithographic prints ==
- 1845: Château de Dompierre
- 1845: Grande Salle de l'Hôtel de Ville de St Quentin
- 1845: Intérieur de l'Église de Notre Dame de Nesle
- 1857: Ancien Hôtel de Ville de Châlons-sur-Marne
- 1857: Ancienne Église St Nicaise à Reims
- 1857: Église d'Hermouville
- 1857: Église St Laurent à Nogent sur Seine
- 1857: Portail du Sud de l'Église de Mézières
- 1857: Portail méridional de l'Église de Réthel
- 1857: Vues d'une partie de l'Église de Bourgogne

== Bibliography ==
- Dictionnaire universel des contemporains, 1865, Gustave Vapereau, (p. 744)
- Biographie universelle des musiciens, 1869, François-Joseph Fétis, (p. 3)
- George Grove, John Alexander Fuller-Maitland, Grove's Dictionary of Music and Musicians, vol.2, 1906, (p. 273)
- René Dumesnil, La musique romantique française, 1944, (p. 140)
- Guide des genres de la musique occidentale, Eugène de Montalembert, Claude Abromont
- Frédéric Robert, La Musique française au XIXe siècle, 1970, (p. 41)
- Carl Dahlhaus, Sieghart Döhring, Pipers Enzyklopädie des Musiktheaters, 1997, p. 370)
- Jean-Louis Tamvaco, Ivor Forbes Guest, Les cancans de l'Opéra, 2000, (p. 994)
- Jean-Jacques Velly, Le dessous des notes, 2001, (p. 73)
- William E. Studwell, Minor Ballet Composers, 2012, (p. 43)
