= Nathalie Fitzjames =

19th century ballet dancer

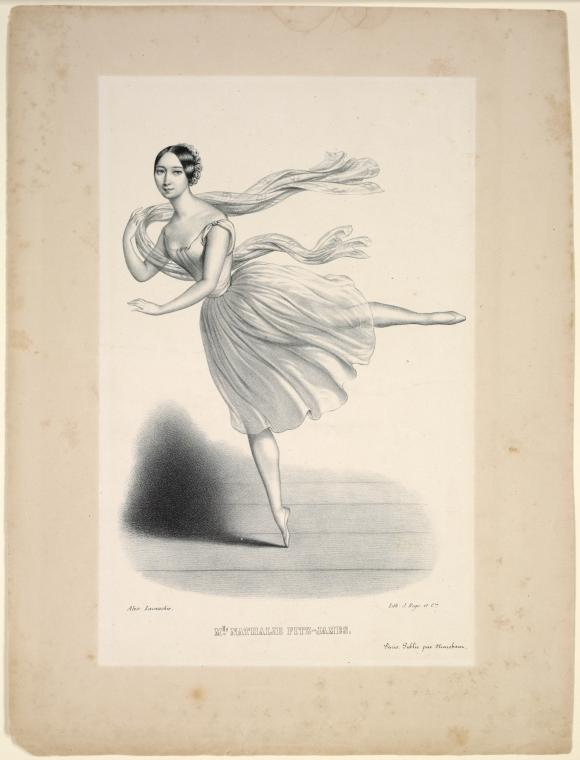
Nathalie Fitzjames, undated lithograph by J. Rigo from a painting by Alex Lacauchie

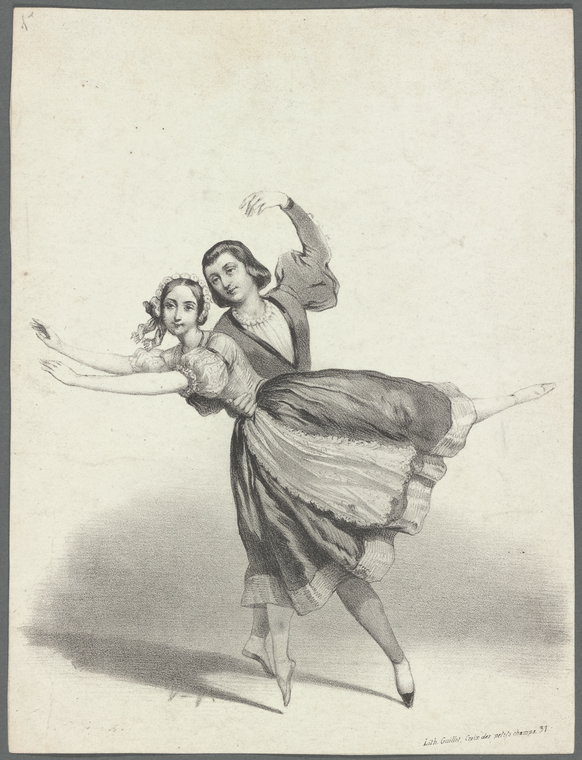
Nathalie Fitzjames and Auguste Mabille in Giselle

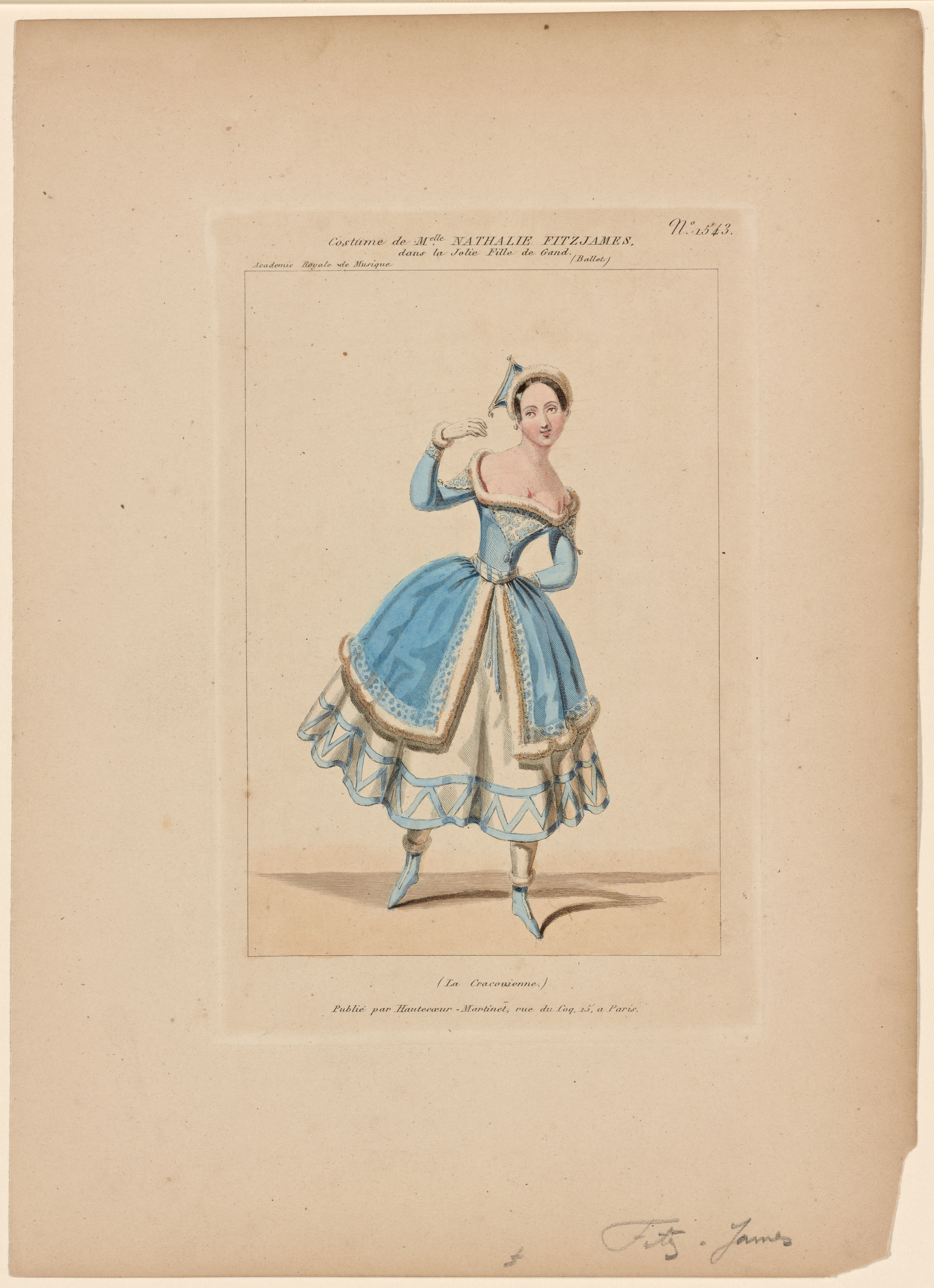
Nathalie Fitzjames's costume, la Cracovienne.

Nathalie (or Natalie) Fitzjames (or Fitz-James, originally Fijan) was a Romantic era French ballerina who was especially admired in Italy. Fitzjames appeared in La Resemblance at Her Majesty's Theatre in London in May 1838, receiving the following review of her first appearance:

"She resembles, both in expression, figure, and style of dancing, our favourite of three years past, Pauline Leroux. Her pretensions as an artiste as not so high as those of Fanny Elssler or Duvernay, but she has been taught in the best school, and in the present state of the ballet she must be considered a decided acquisition here. She is full of spirits and gaiety, and flies about the stage in a manner that is very captivating. The dancing of her feet is near perfection, but her arms are not moved with freedom, and she is deficient to a certain extent both in dignity and grace."

Fitzjames danced the 'peasant pas de deux' in Act 1 of the premiere of Giselle with Auguste Mabille at the Paris Opéra in 1841. She starred in La reine de Chypre, at the Salle Le Peletier of the Paris Opéra on 22 December 1841, and afterwards toured in Italy, receiving acclaim in both Florence and Naples.

In autumn 1850, Fitzjames travelled to New York, where she made her debut in Paquita at the Astor Place Opera House as part of Max Maretzek's opera company. Her part was staged for her by Lucien Petipa. Fitzjames danced the lead role in Terpsichore in another Italian Opera Company production in early 1851, at the Chestnut Street Theatre in Philadelphia. American audiences are reported to have found her too thin for their taste.

Fitzjames was a believer in modernising women's dress. In the spring of 1851, she danced with a so-called "Bloomer Troupe" in Brooklyn, sporting the recently invented and controversial bloomer costume.
