= Ozaï; ou l'Insulaire =

1847 ballet-pantomime by Jean Coralli

Ozaï
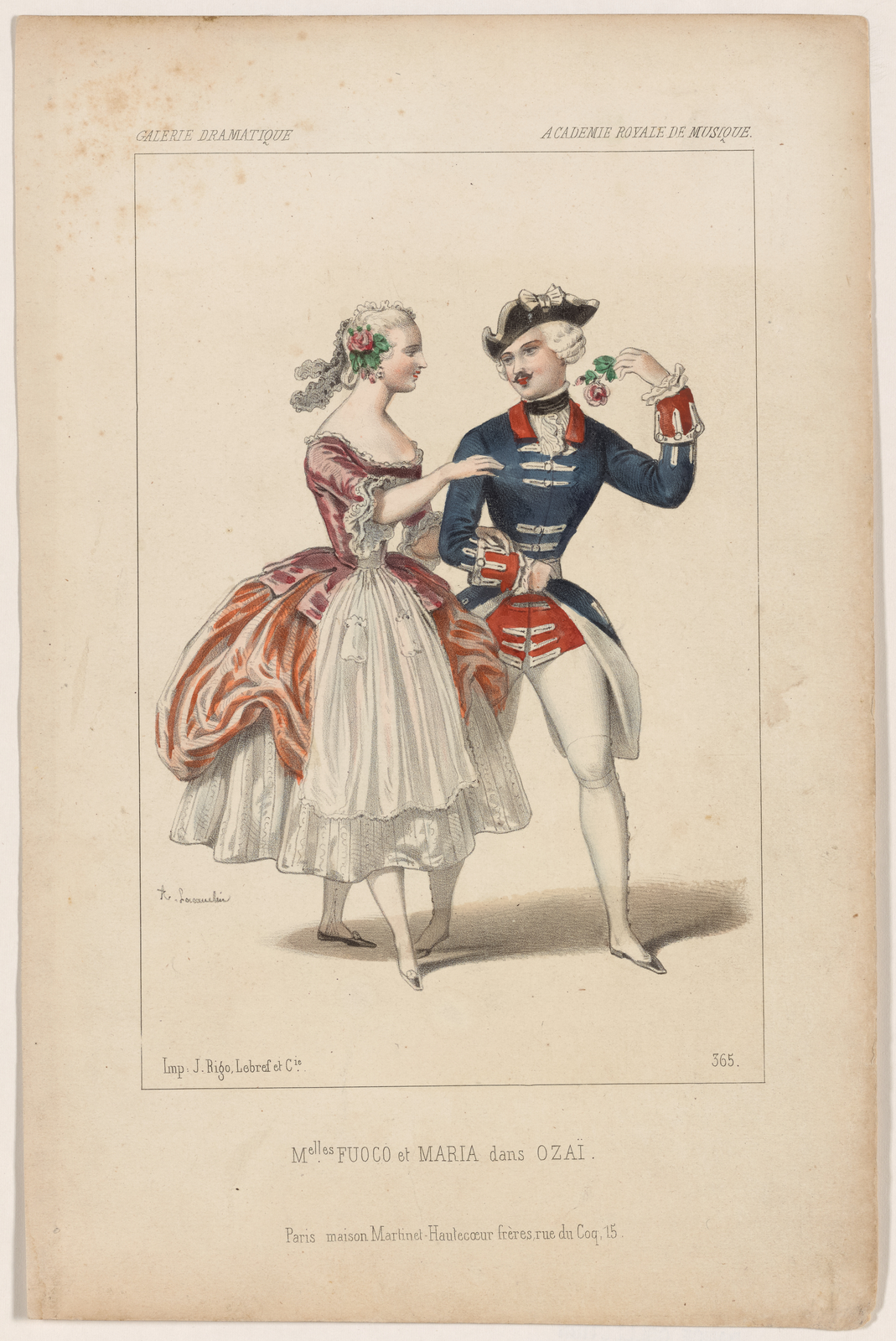
- Native title: Ozaï; ou l'Insulaire
- Choreographer: Jean Coralli
- Music: Casimir Gide
- Premiere: 26 April 1847; Théâtre de l'Académie Royale de Musique, Paris, France
- Genre: Pantomime
- Type: Ballet

Ozaï; ou l'Insulaire (English: Ozaï; or, The Islander) is a French ballet-pantomime created by Jean Coralli and performed in the late 1840s. It succeeded Le Diable boiteux and was Coralli's last ballet.

== Background ==
The ballet Ozaï; ou l'Insulaire was presented in two acts with music composed by Casimir Gide and choreography by Jean Coralli. The costumes were designed by Paul Lormier.

Premiering on 26 April 1847, the first performance took place at the Théâtre de l'Académie Royale de Musique (known as Paris Opéra). It was performed with Belgian ballerina Adeline Plunkett starring in the title role of "Ozaï".

== Music ==
Parisian composer Casimir Gide produced the musical arrangement of Ozaï; ou l'Insulaire. Jean-Baptiste-Joseph Tolbecque later adapted the piece originally composed by Gide for a quadrille score.

== Roles ==
The lead dancers for the 1847 opening of Ozaï were the following artists:

Role	Première cast, 26 April 1847 (Cast member: - )
Ozaï	Mlle Adeline Plunkett
M. De Bougainville	M. Élie
M. de Surville	Desplaces
Abbot (Abbé)	Jean Coralli
Bidgi (mousse négre)	Jean Coralli
Two sailors (Deux Matelots)	Adice, Quériaut
Financier	Monet
The King of France (Le Roi de France)	Lenfant
The Minister of the Navy (Le Ministre de la Marine)	Petit
Jockey	Wiéthof I
Mlle de Bouganville	Mlle C. Émarot
Mme de Bouganville	Mlle Delaquit
La Guimard	Mlle Zélie
La Soubrette	Mlle Pézé
The Marquis	Mlle Maria
French Guard (Le Garde Française)	Mlle Maria

== Synopsis ==
The Ozaï; ou l'insulaire depicts the noble savage and is partially inspired by the adventures of French explorer Louis Antoine de Bougainville. It tells the story of Ozaï, a Tahitian maiden who falls in love with Surville, a shipwrecked sailor. Surville, believing he will never return home, promises to marry Ozaï. However, both end up in France, where Ozaï learns that Surville cannot marry his former betrothed due to his promise to her. Heartbroken, Ozaï decides to relinquish Surville and returns to her South Seas home.
