= Theodor Horschelt =

German painter (1829–1871)

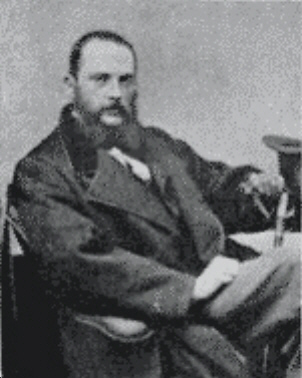
- Born: March 16, 1829; Munich, Kingdom of Bavaria
- Died: April 3, 1871 (aged 42); Munich, Kingdom of Bavaria
- Education: Member Academy of Arts (1860)
- Alma mater: Academy of Fine Arts, Munich
- Known for: Painting

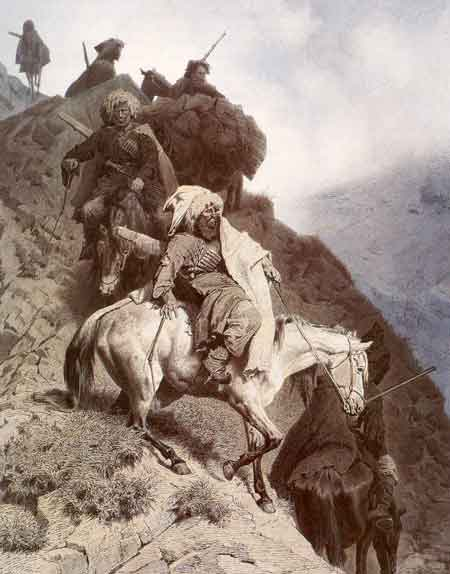
Circassians (date unknown)

Theodor Horschelt (16 March 1829, Munich – 3 April 1871, Munich) was a German painter who specialized in scenes from the Caucasian Wars.

== Biography ==
Theodor Horschelt was the son of ballet master, Friedrich Horschelt. His older brother, Friedrich, was a portrait painter. Beginning in 1846, he went to the Academy of Fine Arts Munich where he was a student of the history painter, Joseph Anton Rhomberg, but left him after a short period and attempted to learn drawing on his own. He initially focused on scenes from nature and imaginative portrayals of the Caucasian Wars.

He soon took direction from Professor Hermann Anschütz, learning precision and clarity of outline. After leaving the academy, he studied with more enthusiasm in the studios of Albrecht and Franz Adam and Julius Lange. He eventually decided to devote himself exclusively to war paintings, and began by doing sketches of horses at the Royal Stables in Stuttgart.

In 1853, he made two study trips; one to Paris with Friedrich Wilhelm Hackländer and one to Spain with him and Christian Friedrich von Leins, where he mostly wandered about on horseback. He separated from his companions when they crossed to North Africa and rode on alone to Algiers. On his return to Munich in 1854, he painted several canvases on Arabian themes for King William. These works made it possible for him to take his long-planned trip to the Caucasus.

=== The Caucasus ===
Soon after his arrival there in 1858, he joined an expedition against the Lezghians. The following year, he was part of a military campaign in Chechnya and participated in an attack on the headquarters of Imam Shamil, exposing himself to enemy fire. For his bravery, he was honored with the Grand Cross Star of the Order of Saint Stanislaus and a medal of the Order of St. Anna, both with swords.

For two weeks in 1860, he toured with Tsar Alexander II on a journey through the Kuban, then joined Prince Albert of Prussia on a tour to Armenia and the shores of the Caspian, returning to Munich by way of Moscow and St. Petersburg in 1863. Once home, he began to produce the war paintings that would establish his reputation. A projected return to the Caucasus was thwarted by the start of the Franco-Prussian War and Horschelt died of diphtheria nine months later.
