= La Tarentule =

1839 ballet-pantomime

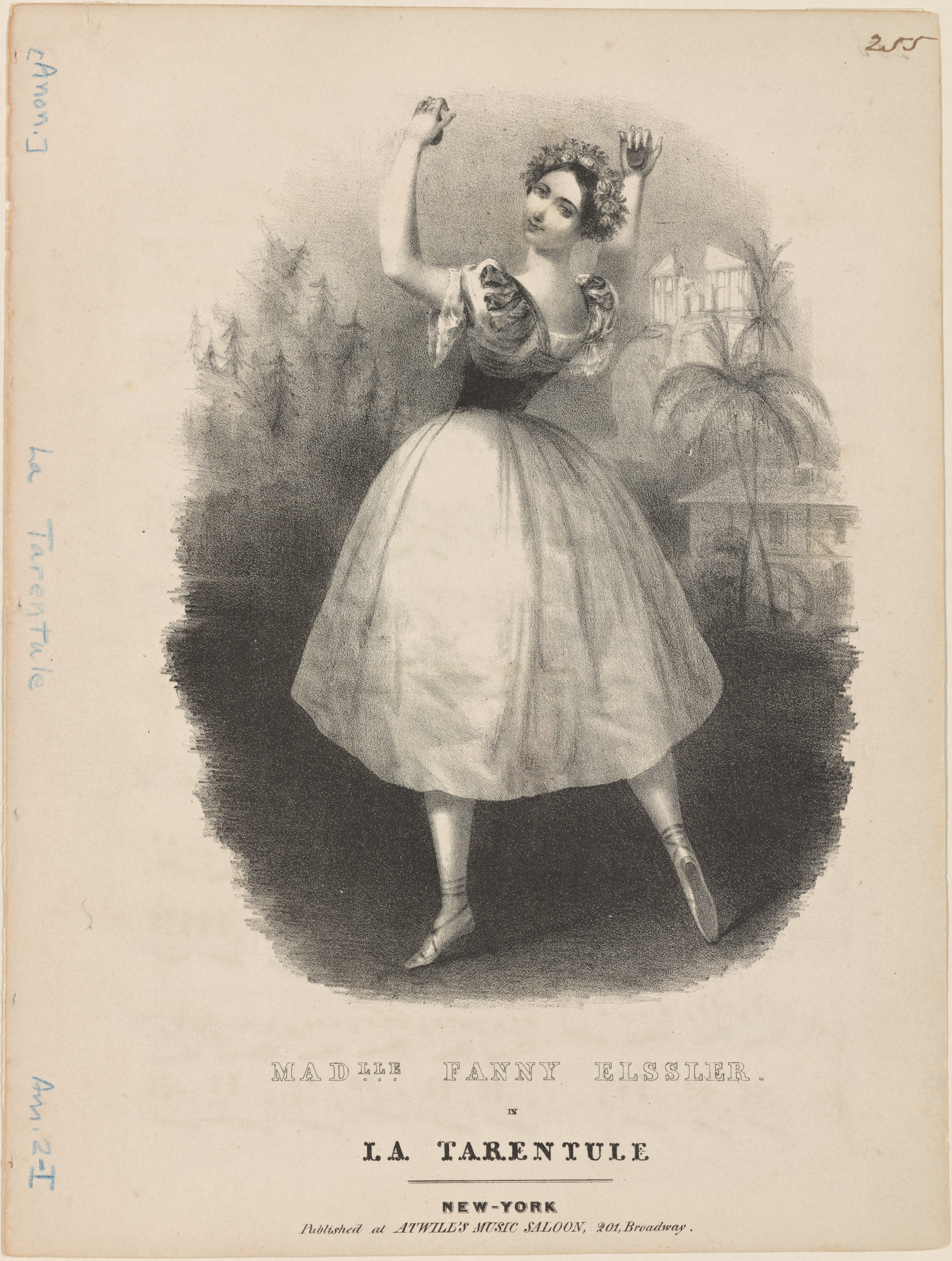
- Native title: La Tarentule
- Choreographer: Jean Coralli
- Music: Casimir Gide
- Libretto: Eugène Scribe
- Premiere: 24 June 1839; Théatre de l'Académie Royale de Musique, Paris, France
- Setting: Calabria, Italy
- Genre: Pantomime
- Type: Ballet

La Tarentule (English: The Tarantula) is a French ballet-pantomime by Casimir Gide, Eugène Scribe, and Jean Coralli which was premiered in the late 1830s during the Romantic period.

== Background ==
The pantomimic ballet La Tarentule was presented in two acts, with Casimir Gide composing the music, Eugène Scribe providing the libretto, and Jean Coralli crafting the choreography.

It premiered to Parisian audiences on 24 June 1839 at the Théatre de l'Académie Royale de Musique (Paris Opéra) in Paris, France. Austrian ballerina Fanny Elssler and French dancer Joseph Mazilier starred in the first performance. In the first act, Fanny and her sister Therese danced in a pas de deux.

== Roles ==
The leading dancers for the opening of La Tarentule were:

Role	Première cast, 24 June 1839 (Cast member: - )
Luidgi (Luigi)	Joseph Mazilier
Oméopatico (Omeopatica)	Barrez I
Le Barigel	L. Petit
Le Sacristain	L. Petit
Lauretta	Mlle Fanny Elssler
Mathéa la mére	Mlle Roland
Clorinde	Mlle Forster

== Setting ==
The story was set in a village in Calabria, Italy. The first act presented the village: a post office with a street-facing balcony on the left, a church door on the right, and a backdrop of the main road and mountains as day broke. The second act showcased a room in the postmistress house, featuring an alcove at the back, side doors, a mirror-topped toilet on the right, and a fireplace with a Madonna above it on the left. A large armchair stood near the fireplace, a lamp illuminated the room, and a clock face adorned the background.

The sets were created by Séchan, Diéterle, Feuchères, and Despléchin, while Paul Lormier designed the costumes.

== Synopsis ==
In La Tarentule, Luigi suffers a bite from a venomous tarantula, and his only hope for a cure lies with Dr. Omeopatica, who demands Luigi's lover, Lauretta, in exchange for the remedy. To save Luigi, Lauretta reluctantly agrees, but she secretly devises a plan to outwit the doctor. As her plot unfolds, the lovers successfully reunite, and Dr. Omeopatica, thwarted, is ultimately sent back to his wife.
