= Adeline Plunkett =

Belgian ballerina (1824–1910)

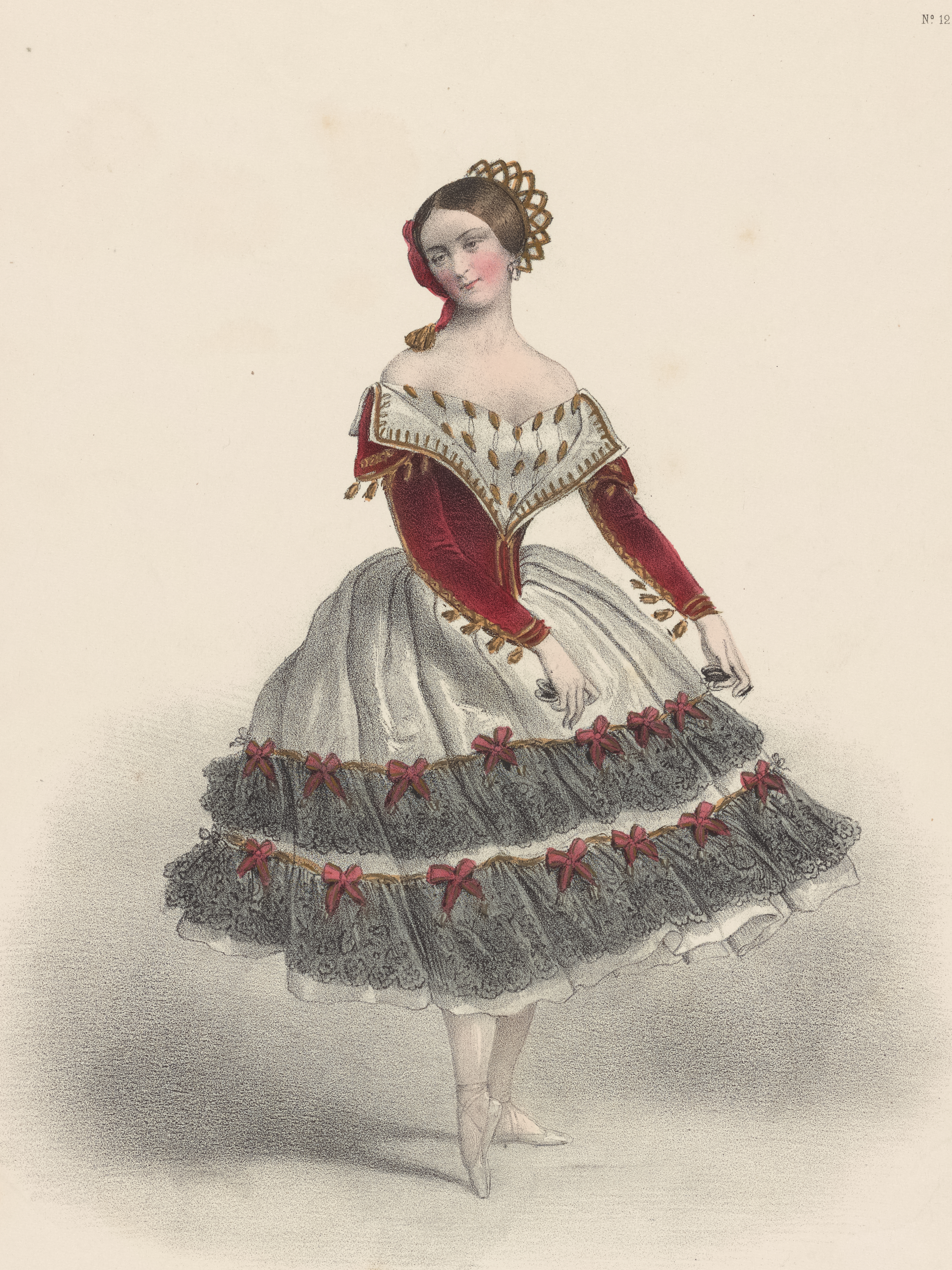
Adeline Plunkett in La favorite (Paris, 1840)

Marie-Adeline Plunkett (31 March 1824 – 8 November 1910) was a star of the Paris Opera Ballet from 1845 to 1857. She had earlier performed at the King's Theatre in London and was also engaged by La Fenice in Venice. She left Paris in 1857, appearing for a time in Rome before returning to Paris where she married the newspaper publisher Paul Dalloz in 1874.

== Biography ==
Born on 31 March 1824 in Brussels, Marie-Adeline Plunkett was possibly of Irish and Flemish ethnicity. She was trained in Paris by the ballet master Jean-Baptiste Barrez (1792–1868). In 1841, she made her début in Trieste before moving to London where she joined the ballet company at the King's Theatre in 1843. While dancing in the ballet Odine, she caused a scandal when she kicked Elisa Scheffer, her rival for the favours of the Earl of Pembroke. She also made brief appearances at Covent Garden, including a performance with Marius Petipa in Les amazones. In June 1845, she appeared at Covent Garden with the Grand Opera of Brussels as Helena in Robert le diable.

She became a principal in the Paris Opera Ballet in 1845, first dancing in La péri. She went on to perform in the premières of Ozaï (1847), Nisida ou les Amazones des Açores (1848) and Vert-vert (1851). She also appeared with Sofia Fuoco in ballet sequence in the opera La Juive and in La Filleule des fées (1850). From 1856 to 1857, she appeared with Pasquale Borri at La Fenice in Venice before moving to Rome where she performed for a few years.

Plunkett returned to Paris where she married the newspaper publisher Paul Dalloz in 1874. She died in Paris on 8 November 1910.
