= Friedrich Horschelt (dancer) =

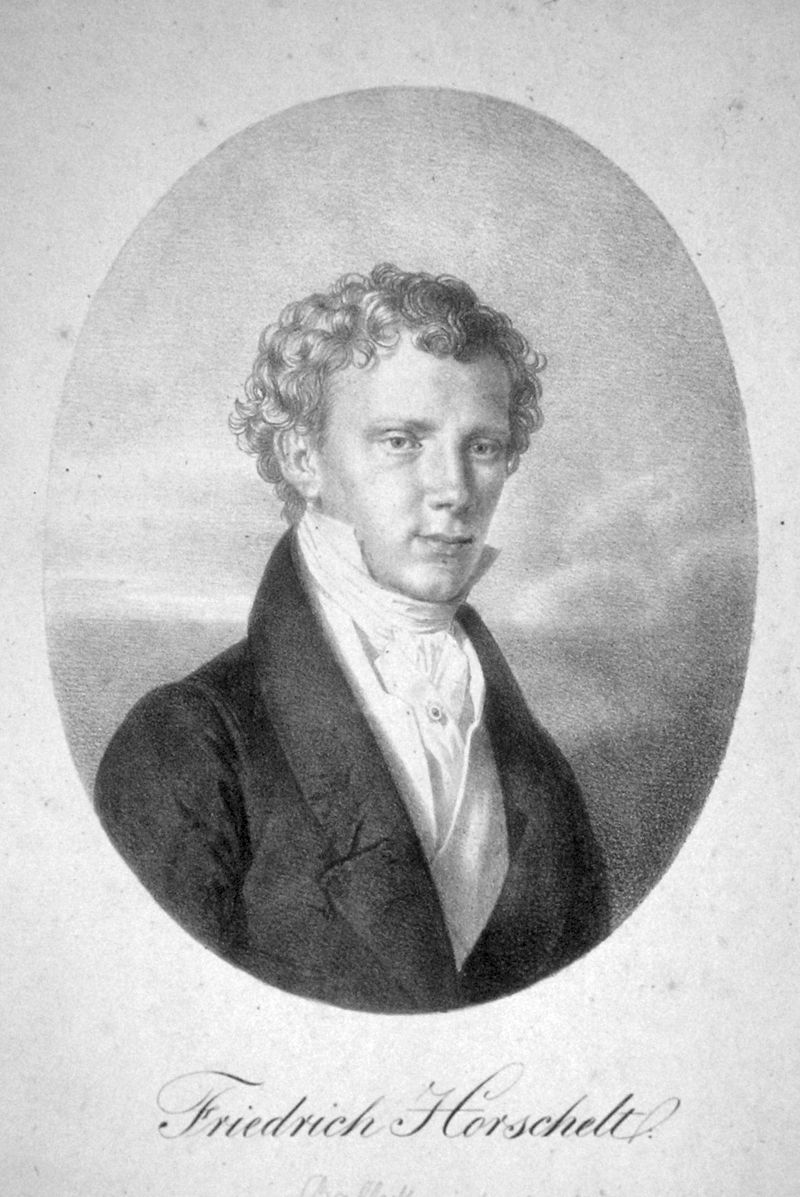
Friedrich Horschelt; by Joseph Lanzedelly the Elder (c.1830)

Friedrich Horschelt (14 April 1793, Cologne - 9 December 1876, Munich) was a German ballet master and impresario.

== Biography ==
He was the son of a ballet master. In 1805, after his father's death, his mother took him and his three sisters on a tour and, in 1806, settled in Vienna. From 1811, he was a dancer and choreographer at the Leopoldstädter Theater. Three years later, he became the assistant to the ballet master at the Theater an der Wien.

In 1815, he created a children's ballet company there, with financial support from Ferdinánd Pálffy, the theater's manager. The famous dancers who got their start with him included, among others, Fanny Elssler, Therese Elssler and Therese Heberle. He directed the company until 1821, when he relocated to Munich to take an appointment as Court Ballet Master. The following year, his ballet company was disbanded, by Imperial order, as the result of a scandal involving Prince Aloys von Kaunitz-Rietberg, who was accused of molesting almost two hundred underage girls, most of whom were in the company. Some believed that Horschelt left Vienna because he was aware of the abuse.

He held the court position until 1829, when his new company began to suffer financial difficulties, and was eventually dissolved. After that, he went on a tour with his wife, Babette Eckner (1804-1889), who was also a dancer; giving guest performances in Vienna, Stuttgart and Milan. In 1837, he was invited back to Munich. He became blind in 1848, and was forced to retire.

His sons, Theodor and Friedrich, both became painters. The former specialized in battle scenes and the latter in portraits. His son, August (1830-1887), followed in his father's footsteps as a dancer.

== Sources ==
- "Horschelt Friedrich". In: Österreichisches Biographisches Lexikon 1815–1950 (ÖBL). Vol. 2, Austrian Academy of Sciences, Vienna 1959, p. 426.
- Joseph Kürschner (1881). "Horschelt, Friedrich". Allgemeine Deutsche Biographie (in German). Vol. 13. Leipzig: Duncker & Humblot. p. 160.
