= Friedrich Horschelt (painter) =

German portrait painter (1824–1881)

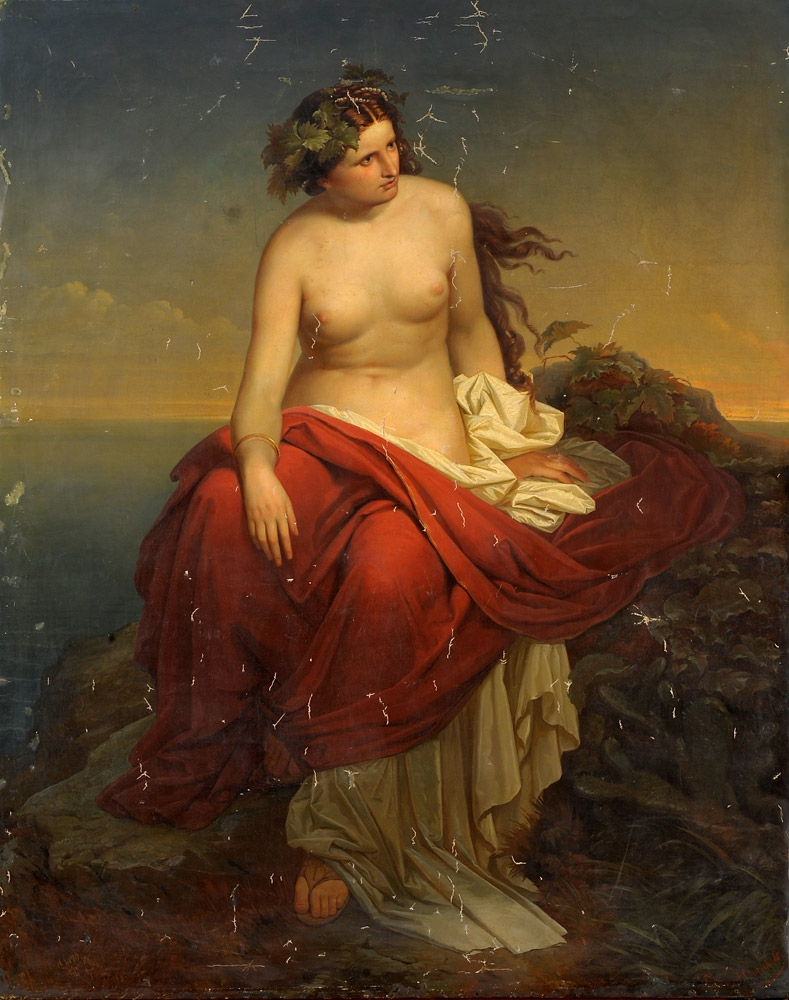
Ariadne on Naxos

Friedrich Horschelt (22 November 1824, Munich - 27 July 1881, Munich) was a German portrait painter.

== Biography ==
He was born to the ballet master, Friedrich Horschelt, and his wife, the dancer Barbara (Babette) Eckner (1804–1889), who had been a soloist in the Munich ballet.

His first drawing lessons were with the history painter, Michael Echter. After 1841, he was a student at the Academy of Fine Arts, Munich. Beginning in 1847, he studied with Charles Gleyre in Paris, and held his first exhibit at the Salon of 1848 at the Louvre.

He then returned to Munich, where he worked as a portrait painter. In 1854, he went to Vienna, with a letter of recommendation from the former King of Bavaria, Ludwig I. Later, he worked in Pest. He returned to Munich in 1863.

The battle painter, Theodor Horschelt, was his younger brother.
