= The Maid of Cashmere =

1830s Opéra-ballet

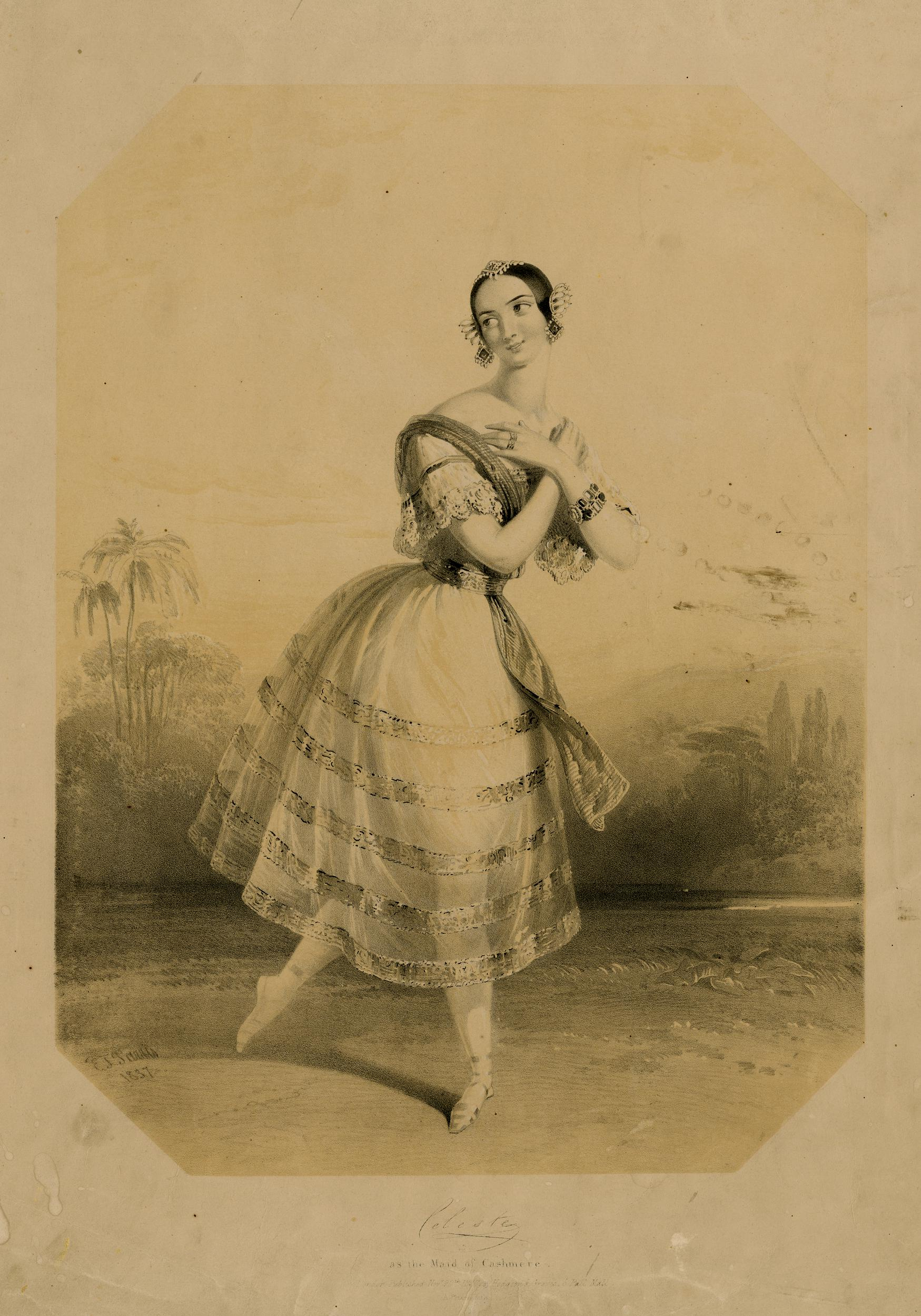
- Céline Céleste as the "Maid of Cashmere"
- Native title: Le Dieu et la Bayadère
- Music: Daniel Auber; Henry Bishop
- Libretto: Eugène Scribe; Edward Fitzball
- Premiere: March 1833; Drury Lane, London, England
- Genre: Opéra-ballet

The Maid of Cashmere is a opéra-ballet created and performed in the 1830s. It was an English version of Daniel Auber's Le Dieu et la Bayadère.

== Background ==
The Maid of Cashmere made its debut in March 1833, combining elements of opera and ballet. It was performed for the first time at Drury Lane on March 16, 1833. It was the English version of La bayadère amoureuse, ou, Le dieu et la bayadère, Eugène Scribe and Daniel Auber's popular piece. The updated version of Auber's ballet was developed collaboratively with Henry Bishop and Edward Fitzball. The music was by Auber's celebrated opera. In its debut in March 1833, the French ballet dancer Pauline Duvernay was featured in the leading role of Zelica. The production aimed to introduce Mlle. Duvernay and the foreign corps de ballet, featuring a shawl dance performed by the female dancers.

The lead role of Zelica was also played by Madame Céleste.

== Roles ==
Role	Première cast, March 1833 (Cast member: - )
Brama, God of the Hindus	Mr. Wood
Ohfour, the Grand Vizier or Judge	Mr. Sequin
Lelia	Miss Betts
Zelica, Chief of a band of Bayadères or dancing girls	Pauline Duvernay
Fatima	Mlle Augusta

== Synopsis ==
The Maid of Cashmere tells the story of Brama, a god who takes mortal form, enduring human suffering to find a woman who truly loves him. After freeing an innocent man, Brama becomes a fugitive and hides in the city of Cashmere, where he encounters Zelica. She rejects the advances of the Grand Vizier, showing a clear affection for Brama, who repeatedly comes to her aid. To test Zelica's love and loyalty, Brama stirs her jealousy by showing interest first in Leila, a singing Bayadère, and then in Fatima, a dancing Bayadère. In a dramatic twist, Brama reveals his divine identity to save Zelica from execution, lifting her to the heavens by his side.
