= Cachucha =

Spanish solo dance

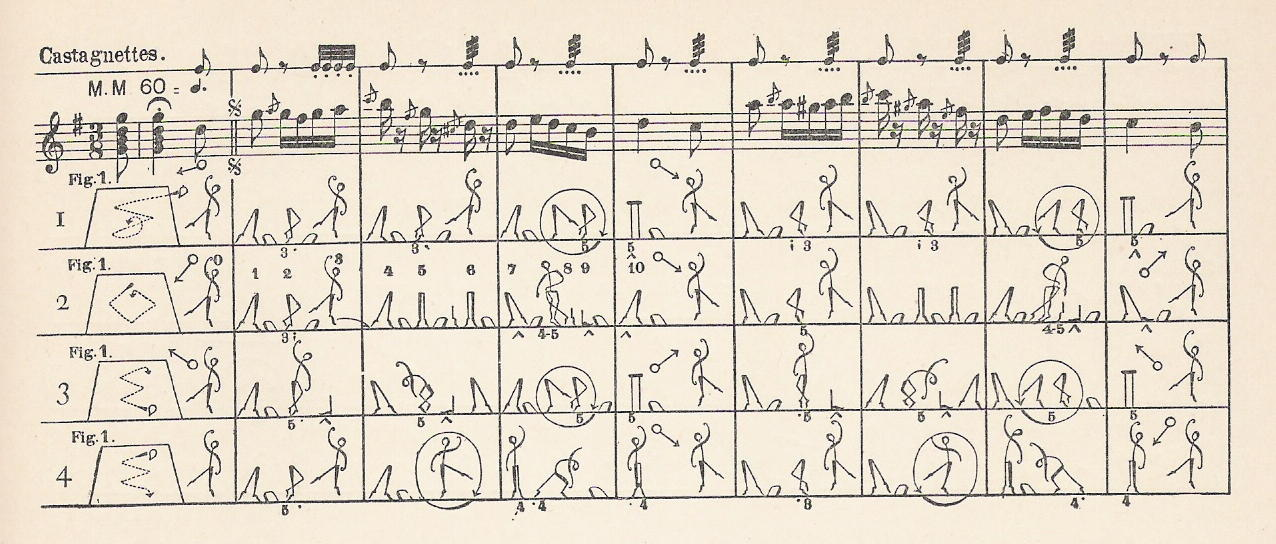
Dance score for La Cachucha, by Friedrich Albert Zorn.

Cachucha is a Spanish solo dance in 3/4 or 3/8 time, similar to the bolero. Cachucha is danced to an Andalusian national song with castanet accompaniment.

== Etymology ==
From Spanish cachucha, small boat. Possibly from diminutive of cacho, shard, saucepan, probably from vulgar Latin cacculus, alteration of Latin caccabus, pot, from Greek kakkabos, a small container.

== History ==
The Cachucha was created in Cuba though it is now considered a Spanish dance. Fanny Elssler (1810-1884, Vienna) popularized this dance when she introduced it to the public in the ballet from Rossini's opera La donna del lago in 1830s London, and cemented its fame in Jean Coralli's ballet Le Diable boiteux (1836, Vienna).

Gilbert and Sullivan set the dance for the entire company in Act 2 of the Savoy Opera The Gondoliers as the chorus sings Dance a Cachucha.
