= Therese Elssler =

Austrian ballet dancer (1808–1878)

- Baroness von Barnim
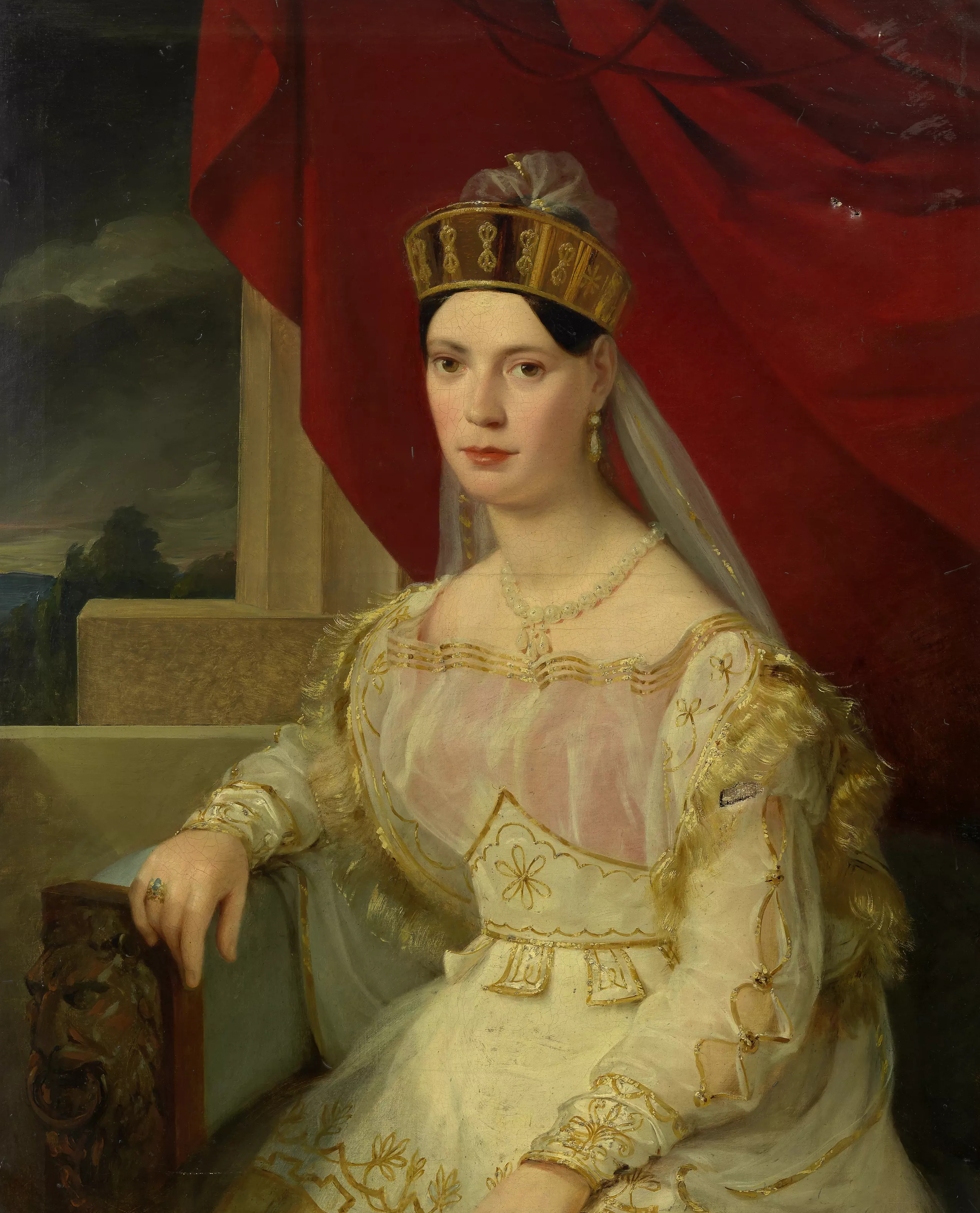
- Elssler in 1829
- Born: 5 April 1808; Vienna
- Died: 19 November 1878 (aged 70); Merano
- Buried: Invalidenfriedhof, Berlin
- Spouse: Prince Adalbert of Prussia (m. 1850; died 1873)
- Issue: Adalbert von Barnim
- Father: Johann Florian Elssler

Therese Elssler (German: Theresia Elßler; 5 April 1808, – 19 November 1878) was a dancer.

Therese and her sister Fanny Elssler (born 1810) were both dancers. Both were born in the Vienna suburb of Gumpendorf. They were daughters of Johann Florian Elssler, the personal scribe of Joseph Haydn. They received their first lessons at Friedrich Horschelt's children's ballet in the Theater an der Wien. They studied dancing with Jean-Pierre Aumer and danced from 1817 to 1825 on the stage of Theater am Kärntnertor and then continued their ballet education in Naples with the great Gaetano Gioja.

They celebrated their first major triumphs in Berlin in 1830. After they had made a stir and acquired fame and considerable wealth through their art and appearance in the capitals of Europe and America, they resigned from the stage in 1841. Fanny's last performance was in 1851 in Vienna. After that, she lived on an estate in Hamburg until 1854, then moved to Vienna.

On 20 April 1850, Therese morganatically married Prince Adalbert of Prussia. King Frederick William IV of Prussia created her Baroness of Barnim. They had one son, Adalbert von Barnim, born in 1841 who died in 1860 during an expedition on the Nile. Prince Adalbert died in 1873. After that, she lived in Bad Homburg.

She died on 19 November 1878 in Merano. She was buried under the name Therese von Barnim on the Invalidenfriedhof in Berlin. Her grave is marked with a restitution grave stone.

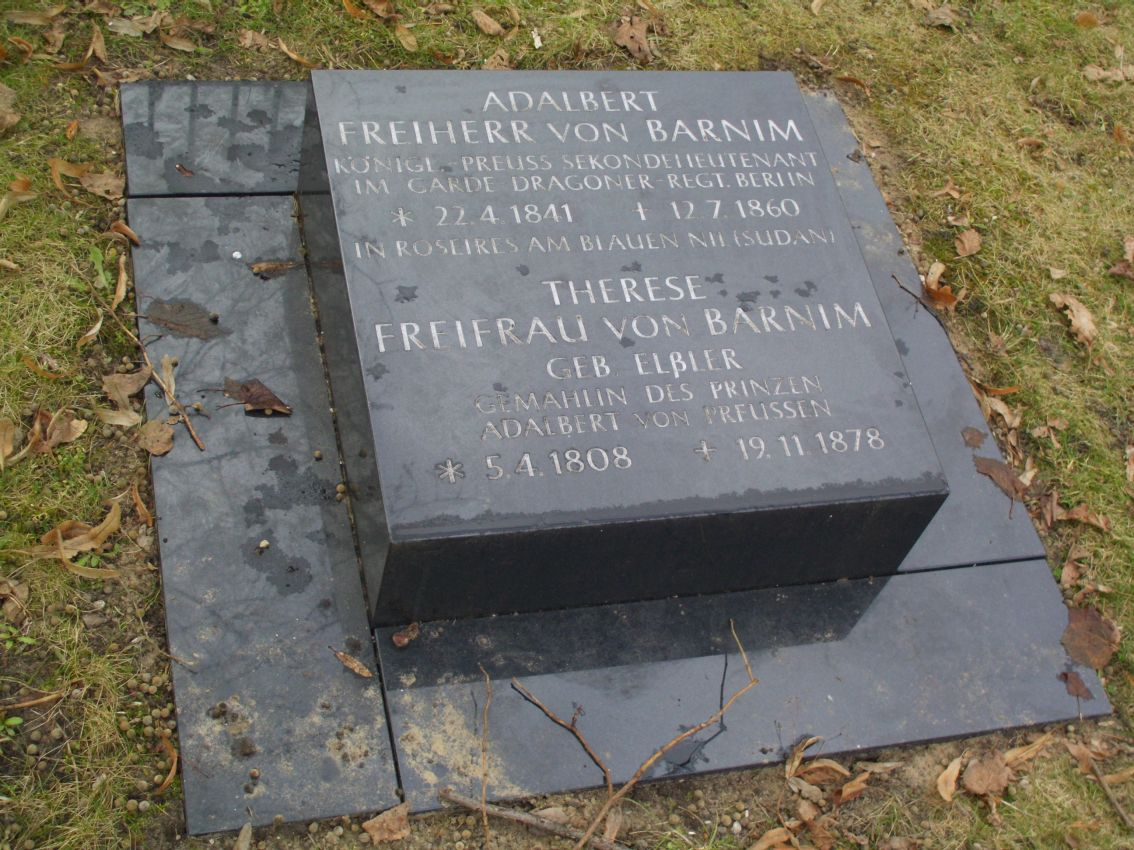
Restitution grave stone of Therese von Barnim (Therese Elssler) and Adalbert von Barnim on the Invalidenfriedhof Berlin (2013)

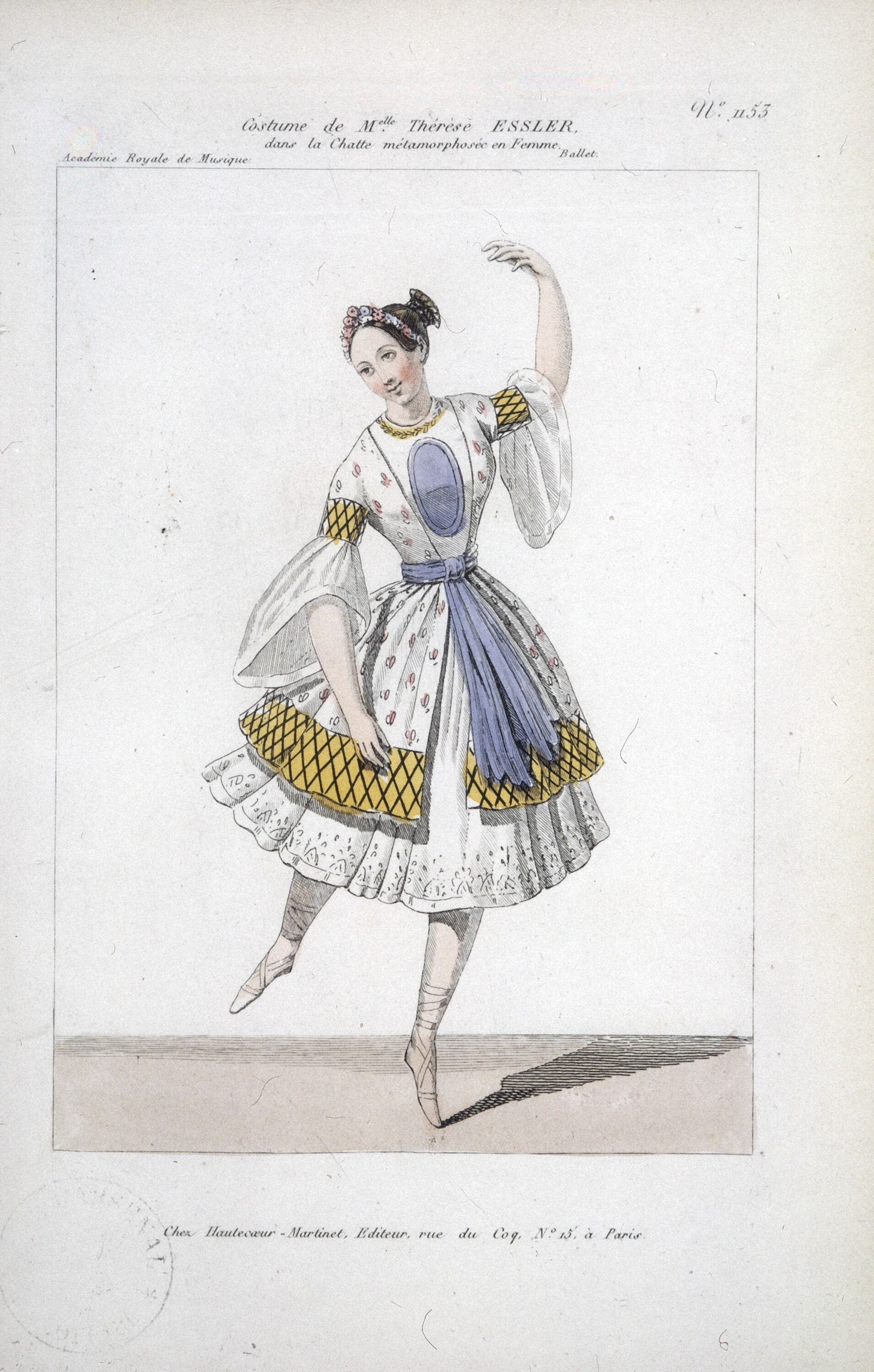
Elssler in La Chatte Métamorphosée en Femme

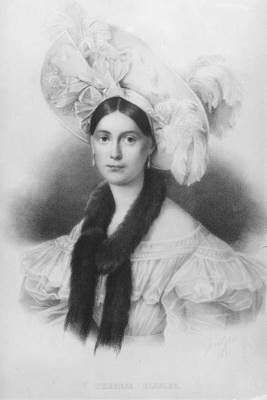
Therese Elssler, lithograph by F. Lentzen

== Sources ==
- "Elßler Theresia Freifrau von Barnim". In: Österreichisches Biographisches Lexikon 1815–1950 (ÖBL). Vol. 1, Austrian Academy of Sciences, Vienna 1957, p. 244.
- Hermann Arthur Lier (1904). "Elßler, Fanny" . Allgemeine Deutsche Biographie (in German). Vol. 48. Leipzig: Duncker & Humblot. pp. 340–341. (additional entry)
- Gertrud Doublier (1959). "Elßler, Fanny". Neue Deutsche Biographie (in German). Vol. 4. Berlin: Duncker & Humblot. pp. 467–468. (additional entry)
