= Amélie Legallois =

French ballet dancer

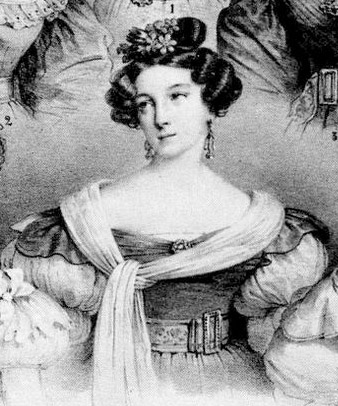
- Born: Amélie Marie Antoinette Legallois; 1 July 1801; Paris
- Died: 28 February 1870 (aged 68)
- Occupation: Paris Opera dancer
- Career
- Dances: Moïse, Manon Lescaut

Amélie Marie Antoinette Legallois (1 July 1801, Paris – 28 February 1870, Paris) was a French dancer.

== Life ==
Amélie Legallois was born on 1 July 1801 in Paris. She studied at Paris Opera ballet school under Jean-Francois Coulon and debuted at the Paris Opera in 1822. Llegallois usually danced first and second roles. Among her best shows should be mentioned Moïse (1827), Manon Lescaut (1830), and L'orgie (1831).

Legallois was also known as a mistress of Marshal of France Jacques Lauriston, who died in her arms in 1828.

Legallois retired in 1837. She died on 28 February 1870 in Paris.

== List of shows ==
- 1827 – Moïse
- 1830 – Manon Lescaut
- 1831 - L'orgie
