= Le Diable boiteux (ballet) =

1836 ballet

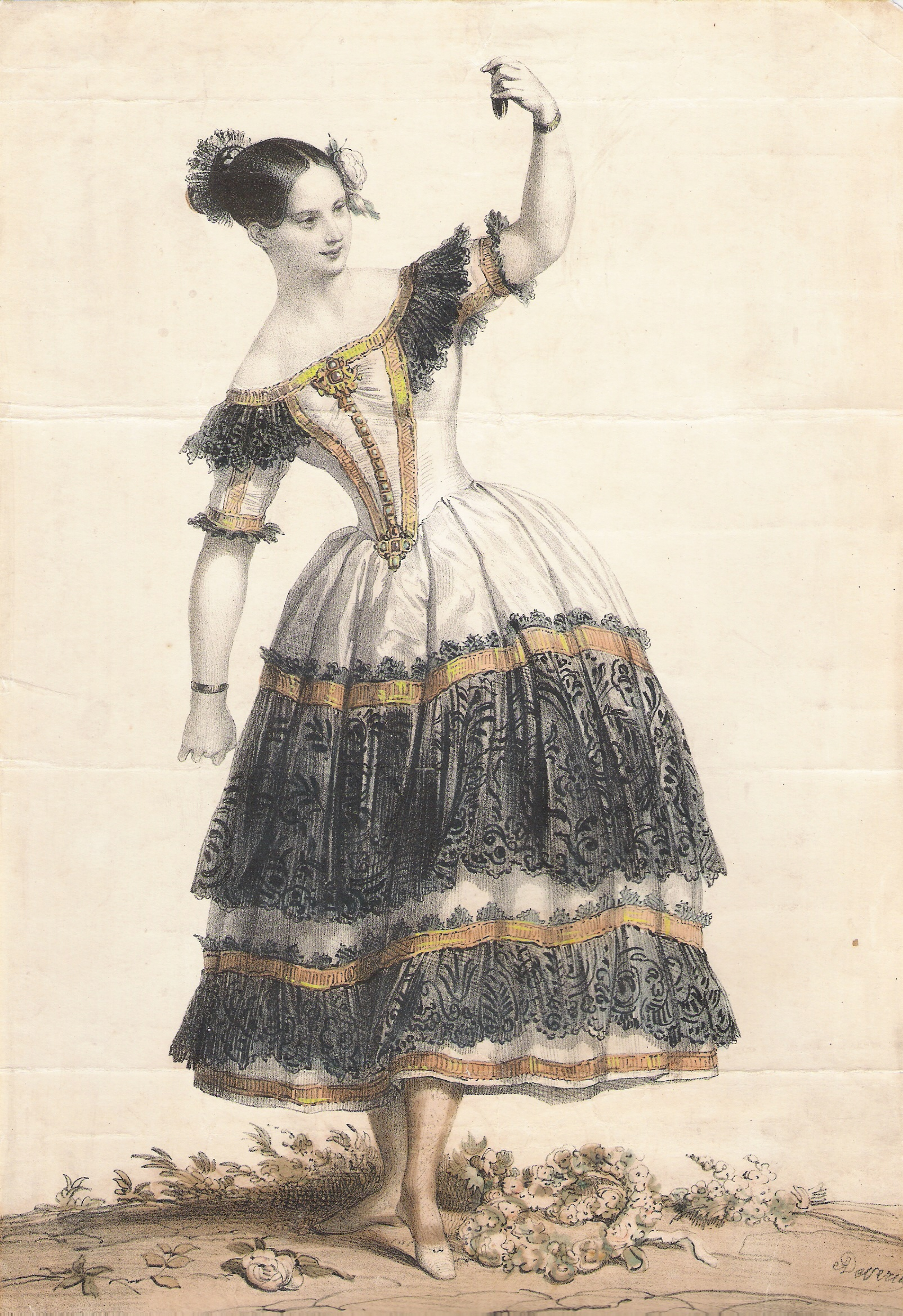
- Fanny Elssler as Florinda in the dance La Cachucha
- Native title: Le Diable boiteux
- Choreographer: Jean Coralli
- Music: Casimir Gide
- Based on: Le Diable boiteux
- Premiere: 1 June 1836

Le Diable boiteux is a ballet in three acts by Jean Coralli, with music by Casimir Gide, which premiered on 1 June 1836 at the Paris Opera. The main roles were played by Fanny Elssler, Joseph Mazilier, Amélie Legallois, Pauline Leroux and Jean-Baptiste Barrez. Loosely inspired by the novel of the same name by Lesage, this ballet was the first great success of Coralli who had, until then, mainly re-edited the ballets of other authors. The cachucha performed by Fanny Elssler was a sensational success.
