= Jean-Baptiste Barrez =

French dancer and ballet master

- Born: 28 November 1792; Paris, French First Republic
- Died: November 28, 1868 (aged 76); Paris, French Empire
- Occupations: Ballet master, dancer

Jean-Baptiste Barrez (28 November 1792 – 27 November 1868) was a French dancer and ballet master.

== Biography ==
He was the son of surgeon Jean-Baptiste Barrez and Julie Jolivet. Barrez studied under Jean-Francois Coulon and was the principal dancer at the Grand Théâtre de Bordeaux from 1817 to 1821. He married Jeanne-Marie Blache, daughter of choreographer Jean-Baptiste Blache, on 28 July 1819. The young couple had a son, Jean-Baptiste Hippolyte Barrez, (born 22 April 1820) who also become a dancer and dance teacher to Spanish dancer Lola Montez.

Jean-Baptiste Barrez began performing at the Paris Opera in 1821 and remained there until 1843. He originated roles in several ballets of Jean Coralli and Joseph Mazilier, including Le Diable boiteux (1836), La Tarentule (1839), Le Diable amoureux (1840) and La Péri (1843). He began teaching ballet at the opera in 1832; Danish ballerina Lucile Grahn was one of his students.

In the spring of 1844, he was called to Madrid, where he worked as a ballet master at the Teatro del Circo and shared the stage with Marie Guy-Stéphan, Clara Galby, Clotilde Laborderie, Ernest Gontié and Marius Petipa.

In 1847, he was hired as a ballet master at the Théâtre de la Monnaie in Brussels, a position he only occupied for one season. He then settled in London the following year.

== Compositions ==
- 1817: Téniers au village, a ballet in two acts (Bordeaux)
- 1847: Terpsichore sur terre, fantastic ballet (Brussels)
- 1853: Souvenir du Hâvre, polka-mazurka for piano (Paris)
- 1865: Arcachon, quadrille-polka for piano, new ballroom dance (Paris)
