= Fanny Elssler =

Austrian ballerina (1810–1884)

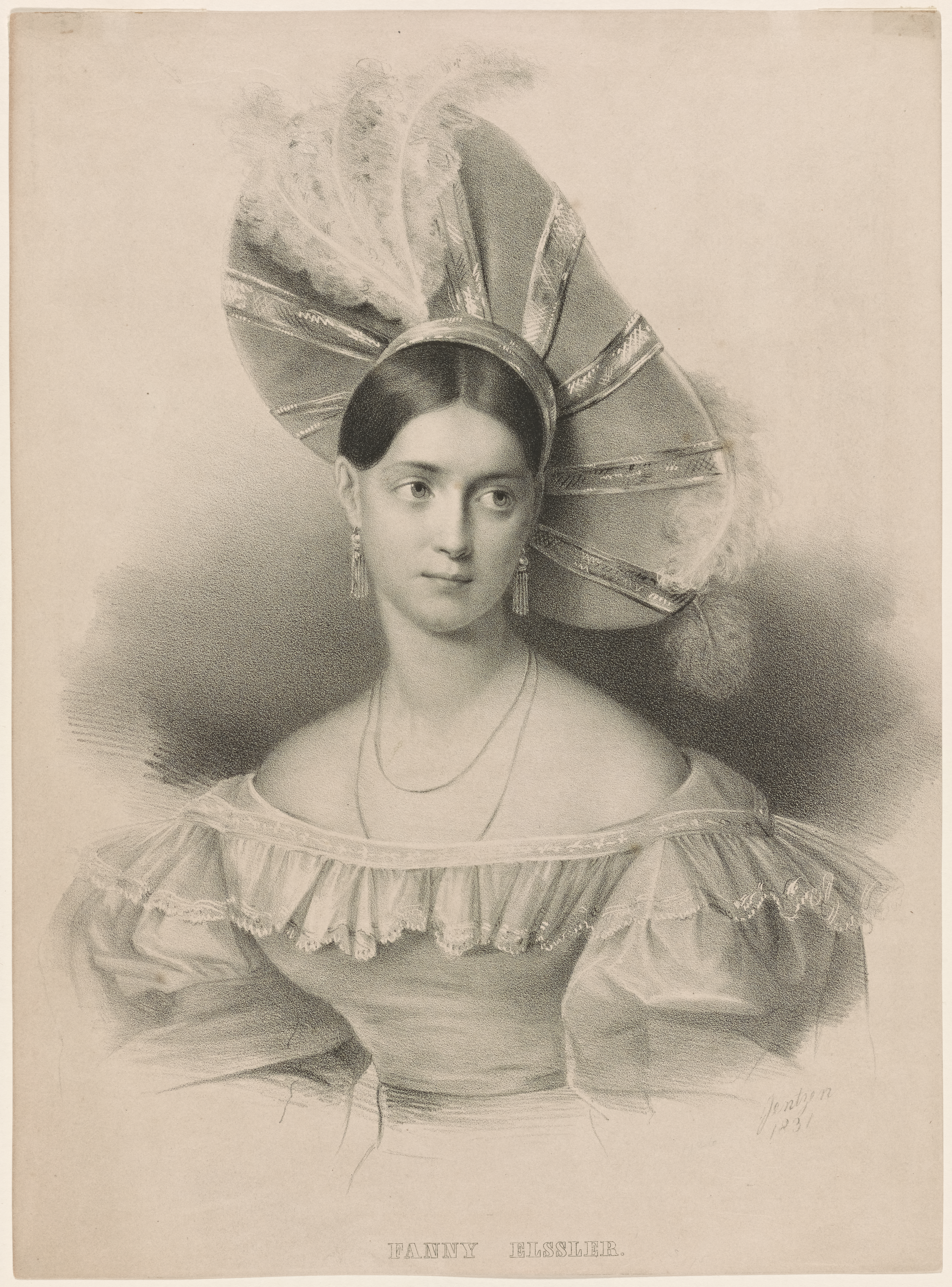
- Portrait, 1831
- Born: Franziska Elßler; 23 June 1810; Gumpendorf, Vienna, Austria
- Died: 27 November 1884 (aged 74); Vienna, Austria
- Occupation: Dancer
- Children: 1
- Relatives: Therese Elssler (sister)

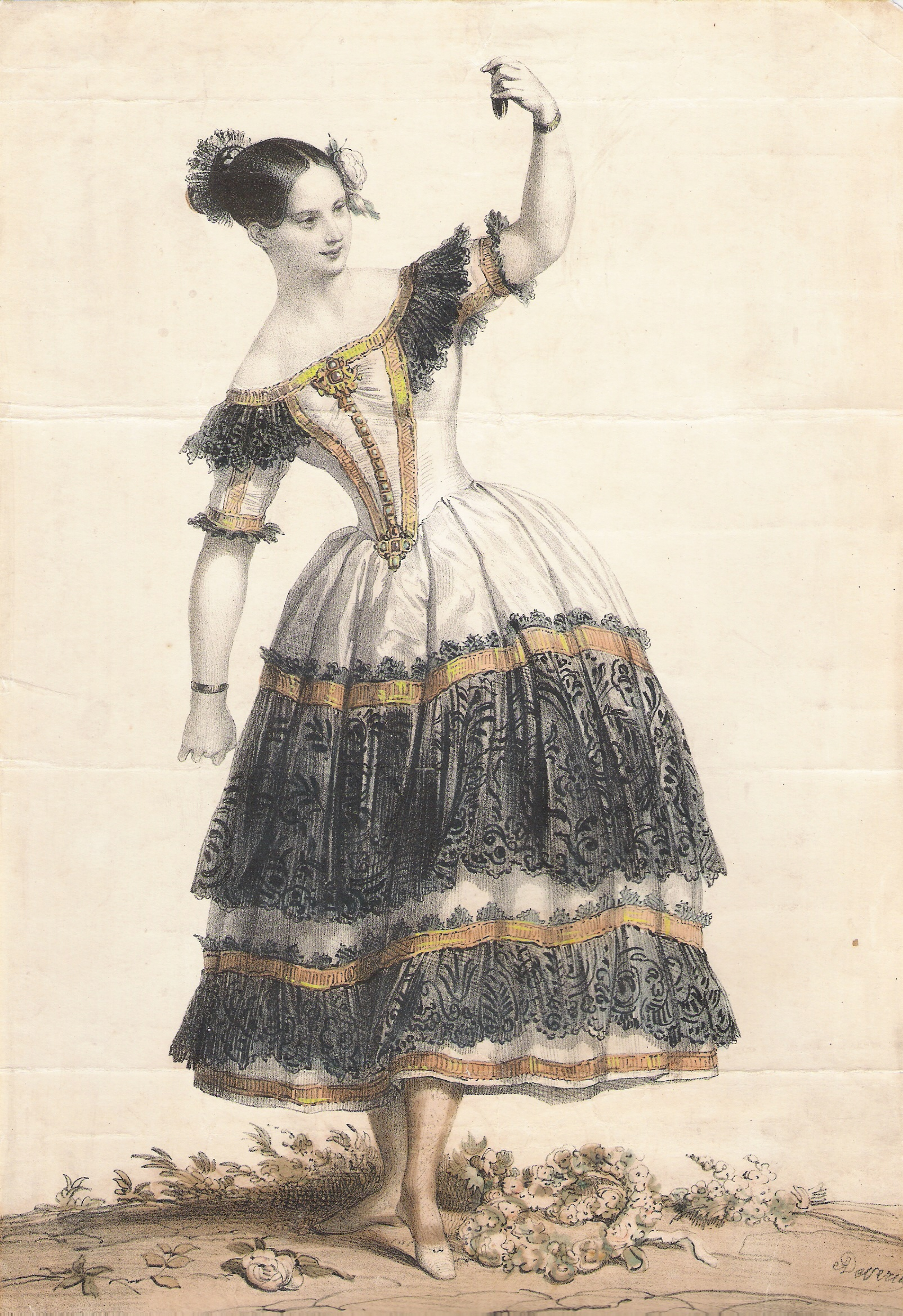
Fanny Elssler as Florinda in the dance La Cachucha from the 1836 Coralli/Gide ballet Le Diable boiteux. Paris, 1836.

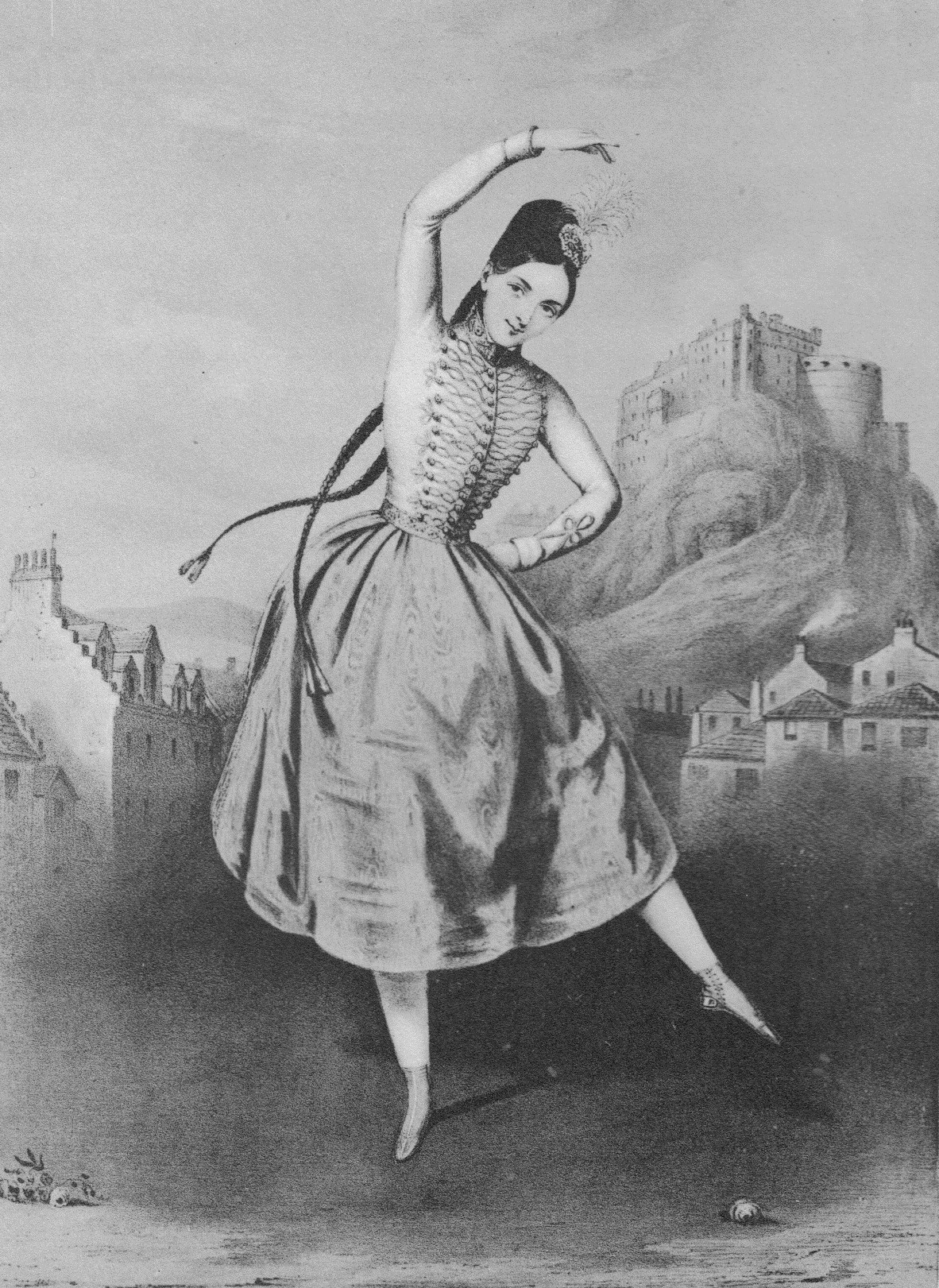
Fanny Elssler as Sarah Campbell in the ballet 'La Gypsy', performed at Her Majesty's Theatre in London in 1839

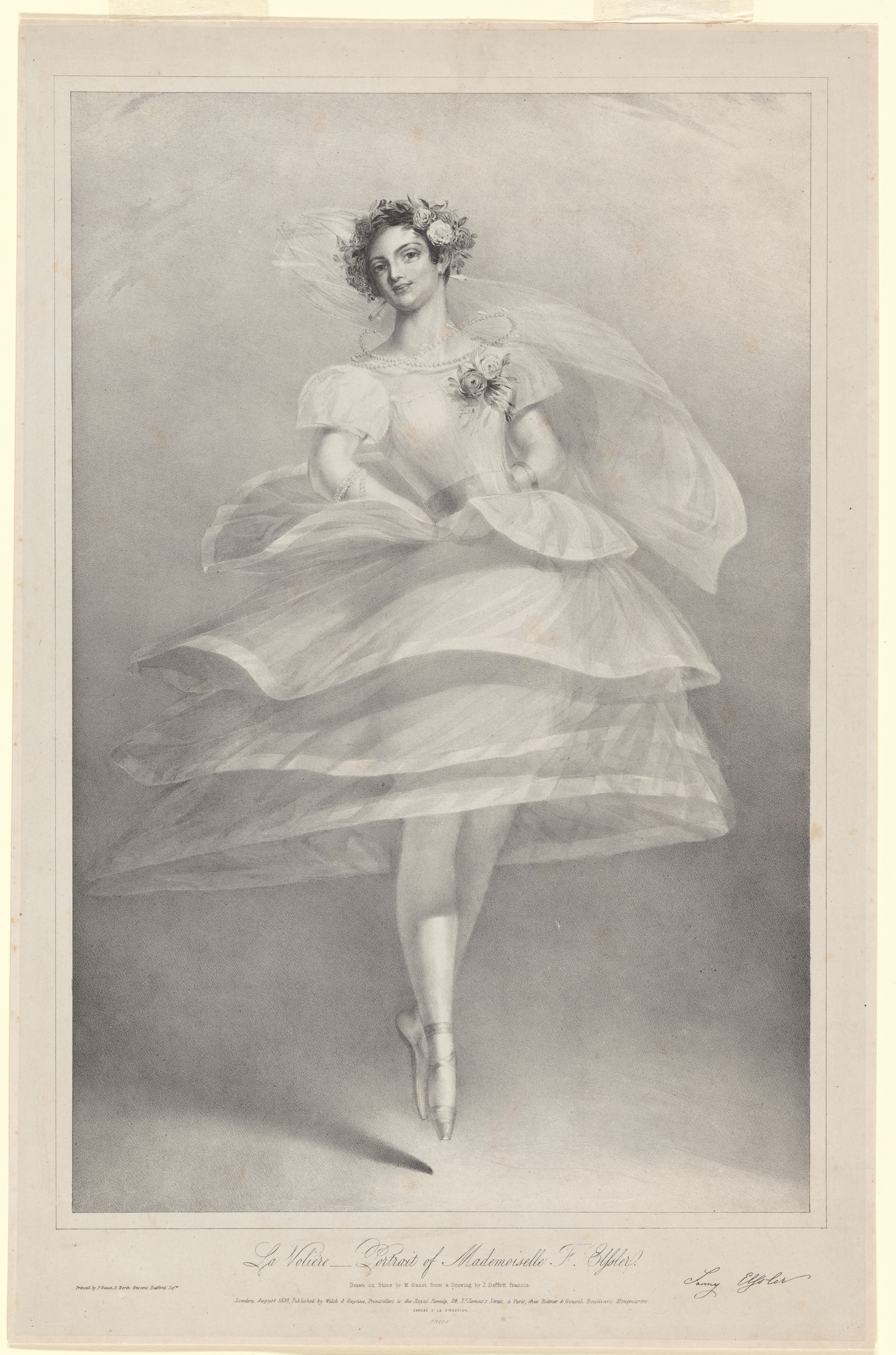
Fanny Elssler dancing in La Volière, a now-forgotten ballet by her sister Therese Elssler

Fanny Elssler (born Franziska Elßler; 23 June 1810 – 27 November 1884) was an Austrian ballerina of the Romantic Period.

== Life and career ==
She was born in Gumpendorf, a neighborhood of Vienna. Her father Johann Florian Elssler was a second generation employee of Nikolaus I, Prince Esterházy. Both Johann and his brother Josef were employed as copyists to the Prince's Kapellmeister, Joseph Haydn. Johann was to eventually become valet to Haydn and attended Haydn up to and was present at Haydn's death.

From her earliest years she was trained for the ballet, and made her appearance at the Kärntnertortheater in Vienna before she was 7. She almost invariably danced with her sister Therese, who was two years her senior; the sisters studied dancing with Jean-Pierre Aumer and Friedrich Horschelt beginning when Elssler was 9 years old, also traveling to Naples, Italy, to study with Gaetano Gioja. After some years' experience together in Vienna, the sisters went in 1827 to Naples. While there, she had an affair with Leopold, Prince of Salerno, the son of King Ferdinand I of the Two Sicilies, which resulted in the birth of a son, Franz.

Their success in Naples, to which Elssler contributed more than her sister, led to an engagement in Berlin in 1830. This was the beginning of a series of triumphs for Elssler's personal beauty and skill in dancing. After captivating all hearts in Berlin and Vienna, and inspiring Friedrich von Gentz with a remarkable passion, she paid a visit to London, where she received much kindness at the hands of George and Harriet Grote, who practically adopted the little girl who was born three months after the mother's arrival in England.

In September 1834, Elssler appeared with the Ballet du Théâtre de l'Académie Royale de Musique (today known as the Paris Opera Ballet), a step to which she looked forward with much misgiving on account of Marie Taglioni's supremacy on that stage. However, Elssler and Taglioni were exceptionally different dancers, and the Opera's management saw this as an opportunity to incite some controversy by hiring Elssler. Taglioni was known as a danseur ballonné, represented by the lightness of her leaps and jumps. Elssler, on the other hand, distinguished her dancing with the precision in which she performed small, quick steps. Elssler's type of dancing was known as danse tacquetée. The results of her performances, however, were another triumph for Elssler, and the temporary eclipse of Taglioni. Taglioni, although considered the finer artist of the two, could not for the moment compete with the newcomer's personal fascination. It was conspicuous in her performance of the Spanish Cachucha (from the 1836 Coralli/Gide ballet Le Diable boiteux) that Elssler outshone all rivals. Elssler was not Spanish, but her performances of the Cachucha were filled with fire and sensual life. The poet Théophile Gautier titled her the "pagan" dancer because of her performances in the Cachucha, juxtaposed with Taglioni, the "Christian" dancer. The success of Elssler and the Cachucha led to a widespread demand for more choreographed ballet dances of specific national flavor. These types of dances became very popular, and Elssler herself added a Polish cracovienne (Krakowiak) and an Italian tarantella to her repertoire. Her image was often identified with pink satin and black lace as the fleshy, sensuous Spanish dancer, in stark contrast to depictions of Taglioni as the modest sylph in white. Elssler did not only possess technical gifts, her ability to perform dramatically was exceptional. Her performances of the great Romantic ballets, including La Sylphide, Giselle and La Esmeralda, portrayed heightened aspects of their former characters. This earned Elssler a place among the most talented and notable ballerinas of the Romantic ballet period.

In 1840 she, with her sister, traveled by sea to New York for a tour arranged by Henry Wikoff, and after two years of unmixed success they returned to Europe. While in New York City, Elssler dined with and was escorted by John Van Buren, son of the President of the United States, Martin Van Buren. In Washington D.C., Congress closed so that no one need miss Elssler's performance. Elssler is considered by Lillian Moore to have been "the most illustrious Sylphide ever to dance the role in America", with the final scene bringing many audience members to tears. At the St Charles Theater in New Orleans, Elssler was contracted for two weeks at $1,000 for every night that she danced. Fans across the country not only attended her performances but also experienced "Elsslermania," buying Elssler brand champagne, bread, cigars and many other products. They greeted her exuberantly but debated whether her talent warranted such over-the-top displays of celebrity worship.

During the following five years Elssler appeared in Germany, Austria, France, England, and Russia. In 1845, she was invited to perform along with her rivals Marie Taglioni, Carlotta Grisi and Fanny Cerrito in Jules Perrot's Pas de Quatre in London, but she declined. In the same year, having amassed a fortune, she retired from the stage and settled near Hamburg. A few years later her sister Theresa contracted a morganatic marriage with Prince Adalbert of Prussia, and was ennobled under the title of Baroness von Barnim. Theresa was left a widow in 1873, and died on 19 November 1878. Fanny Elssler died in Vienna on 27 November 1884.

She was played by Lilian Harvey in the 1937 German film Fanny Elssler. Lya Mara had previously played her in the 1920 silent film Fanny Elssler.

== See also ==
- List of dancers
- Women in dance
