= Jean Coralli =

French ballet dancer and choreographer

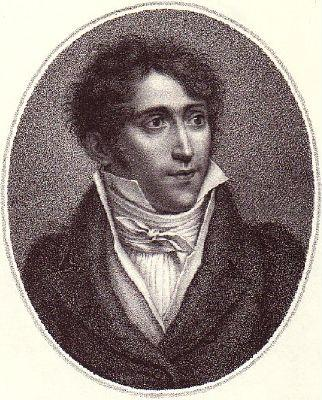
- Jean Coralli, circa 1810
- Born: Giovanni Coralli Peracini; 15 January 1779; Paris, France
- Died: 1 May 1854 (aged 75); Paris, France
- Occupations: Ballet dancer; Choreographer; Ballet master
- Years active: 1802–1854
- Known for: Choreographing Giselle (1841) with Jules Perrot
- Spouse: Teresa Coralli

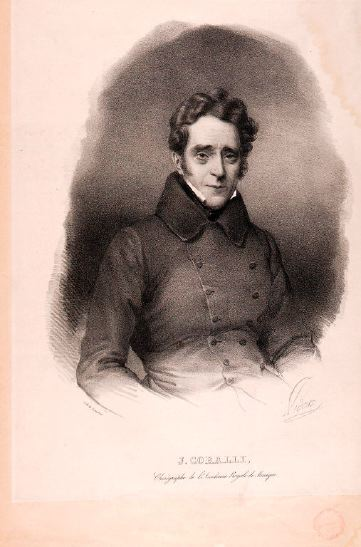
Jean Coralli, circa 1830

Jean Coralli (15 January 1779 – 1 May 1854) was a French ballet dancer and choreographer, best known for collaborating with Jules Perrot in creating Giselle (1841), the quintessential Romantic ballet of the nineteenth century.

== Early life and career ==
Born Giovanni Coralli Peracini, he was a son of a Bolognese family resident in Paris, where his father was a comedian at the Théâtre Italien. As a child, he studied at the ballet school of the Paris Opera but chose to go to Vienna to make his debut as a dancer and choreographer. He danced for a short while at the Paris Opera in 1802 and at the King's Theatre in London and then returned to Vienna to assume the position of ballet master at the Hoftheater (Court Theater). During these early years, he and his wife formed the celebrated dancing couple Giovanni and Teresa Coralli and were often pictured in contemporary prints. They danced leading roles in most of the ballets that Coralli created at the Hoftheater, including Helena und Paris (1807). Beginning in 1809, the Corallis appeared as principal dancers at the Teatro alla Scala in Milan, at the Teatro La Fenice in Venice, and at the Teatro São Carlo in Lisbon.

From 1825 to 1829, Coralli served as ballet master of the Théâtre de la Porte Saint-Martin in Paris, where he created ten full-length ballets and divertissements for fourteen plays. His company included Charles-François Mazurier, a noted comic dancer, as well as Jules Perrot (1810-1892) and Joseph Mazilier (1801-1868), talented dancers who would both become famous choreographers. The Porte Saint-Martin was known for its championship of the Romantic drama and its innovative ballets, many of which anticipated the productions of the Paris Opera. For an 1828 play, Coralli choreographed a pas de sylphides that foreshadowed the supernatural ballets blancs of later years.

== Working at the Paris Opera ==
In 1831, Coralli was engaged as premier maître de ballet of the Paris Opera, replacing Jean-Louis Aumer. His first work there was a revival and restaging of his 1828 work Léocadie, with a new scenario by Eugene Scribe, a new score by Michel Carafa, and a new title, L'Orgie (1831). It told the story of a young girl seduced by a nobleman and then abandoned, a theme to which Coralli would return in later works. His next was the ballet for the opera La Tentation (1852), which capitalized on the growing vogue for plays, ballets, and operas with a supernatural aspect. It was the first of his many works for the opera stage. This was followed by a major dance work, La Tempête, ou L'Ìle des Génies (The Tempest, or The Isle of Magic Spirits, 1834), set to a score by Jean Schneitzhoeffer. Pauline Duvernay and Joseph Mazilier danced the lovers Léa and Fernando, and the young Viennese ballerina Fanny Elssler, then just beginning her rise to fame, took the role of the fairy Alcine. Elssler became a true star in Coralli's next work, Le Diable Boiteau (The Lame Devil, 1836), in which she famously performed "La Cachucha," a Spanish dance that she may, in fact, have choreographed herself.

The pinnacle of Coralli's choreographic career was in 1841, when the ballet Giselle, ou Les Wilis was first presented during the summer season at the Paris Opera. The scenario, written by Théophile Gautier in collaboration with Jules-Henri Vernoy de Saint-Georges, was set to a score by Adolphe Adam, which had been brought to Coralli's attention by Jules Perrot, who was interested in finding a starring vehicle for his protégée Carlotta Grisi. At the premiere, Grisi was partnered by Lucien Petipa in the role of Albrecht, the prince whose betrayal leads her to madness and death. The "peasant pas de deux" in act 1, set to interpolated music by Friedrich Burgmüller, was performed by Nathalie Fitzjames and Auguste Mabille, and Adèle Dumilâtre danced the demanding role of Myrtha, queen of the wilis, vengeful spirits of dead maidens deceived by their lovers.

Gautier and the composer Burgmüller were again Coralli's collaborators in his next ballet, La Péri (1843), a complicated tale of an oriental fairy beloved by a youth who sees her in an opium dream. With Grisi and Petipa as the principal dancers, Coralli's choreography was acclaimed by press and public, and the ballet enjoyed a great success. His penultimate ballet, Eucharis (1844), was a failure, and his last ballet, Ozaï (1847), was performed only ten times. Coralli retired from his position at the Paris Opera in 1854 and died only four years later.

== Selected works ==
Coralli's chief works include in following.

- 1806: Paul et Rosette
- 1806: Amphion
- 1807: Les Incas
- 1807: Hélène et Pâris
- 1815: La Dansomanie
- 1816: Les Noces de Zéphire et Flore
- 1825: La Statue de Vénus
- 1825: Les Ruses Espagnoles
- 1826: Monsieur de Pourceaugnac
- 1826: Gulliver
- 1826: La Visite à Bedlam
- 1827: Le Mariage de Raison
- 1827: La Neige
- 1828: Les Hussards et les Jeunes Filles
- 1828: Léocadie
- 1829: Les Artistes
- 1830: La Somnambule
- 1830: Le Mariage de Raison
- 1831: L'Orgie
- 1832: La Tentation
- 1834: La Tempête, ou L'Île des Génies
- 1836: Le Diable Boiteux
- 1837: La Chatte Métamorphosée en Femme
- 1839: La Tarentule
- 1841: Giselle, ou Les Wilis, with Jules Perrot
- 1843: La Péri
- 1844: Eucharis
- 1847: Ozaï

== See also ==
- List of dancers
