= La tentation =

Ballet-opera in a five-act form

- Ballet-opera by Fromental Halévy
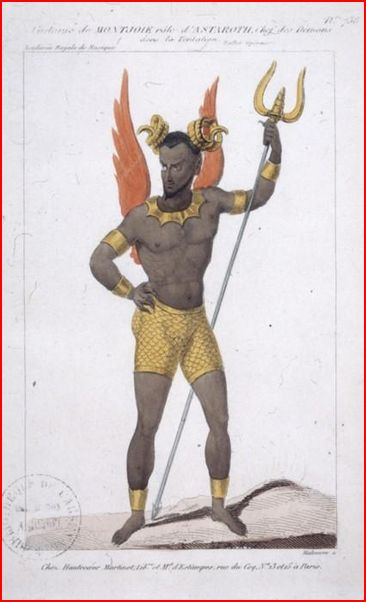
- Costume design for Astaroth in the premiere
- Librettist: Edmond Cavé; Henri Duponchel
- Language: French
- Premiere: 20 June 1832; Salle Peletier, Paris

La tentation is a ballet-opera, a hybrid work in which both singers and dancers play major roles. It was premiered in 1832 in its original five-act form by the Paris Opéra at the Salle Le Peletier. Most of the music was by Fromental Halévy, and the libretto was by Edmond Cavé and Henri Duponchel. The choreography was by Jean Coralli, and the decor by a number of hands including Eduard Bertin, Eugène Lami, Camille Roqueplan and Paul Delaroche. After the first 29 performances, mostly separate acts were performed (either the first, second, or fourth) in conjunction with another work, although it was occasionally revived in its entirety in 1833, 1834, and 1835. In all, it was given complete 46 times, and as separate acts on 60 occasions.

== Composition history ==
The format of La tentation is unusual, with both singers and dancers taking leading roles. The music for the opera sections was written by Halévy; that for the ballet portions by Halévy and Casimir Gide. The director of the Opéra, Louis Véron, wrote in his memoirs that, during the cholera epidemic in Paris;

I wished neither to make use of nor to jeopardize any of the important works of the repertory. We ... busied ourselves with ... rehearsals for La tentation. This five-act fairy tale was merely a series of tableaux, of which the chorus and the corps de ballet were the stars. [These] can always be replaced, and scenery, at least, never falls ill. La tentation ... was thus a work always in readiness for presentation.

The date of the premiere is given by Marian Smith as 12 March 1832; however the printed libretto gives the date 20 June. The music contains several direct quotations from Beethoven, including from his Fifth Symphony (in the act 2 meeting of the demons) and his Pathétique sonata.

On 2 August 1832, Frédéric Chopin wrote to Ferdinand Hiller that "La tentation, an opera-ballet by Halévy and Gide, tempted no-one with any good taste, since it is as dull as your German parliament is out of keeping with the spirit of our century". However, the work was a box-office success and had over 50 performances in its first season, and over 50 performances in the next 6 years, although it does not seem to have been revived since then. The autograph score is in the Bibliothèque de l'Opéra in Paris.

== Roles ==
| Role | Role type | Premiere cast, 20 June 1832 (Conductor: ) |
|---|---|---|
| The hermit | dancer | Joseph Mazilier |
| Marie, a young pilgrim | dancer | Pauline Leroux |
| Hélène, young woman of Iconium | soprano | Julie Dorus |
| Mizaël, angel | soprano | Zulmé Dabadie |
| Astaroth, king of the demons | dancer | Louis-Stanislas Montjoie |
| Miranda, daughter of hell | dancer | Pauline Duvernay |
| Anubri, she-devil | mezzo-soprano | Constance Jawureck |
| Raca, she-devil | dancer | Louise Élie |
| Ditikan, demon | dancer | François-Louis-Sylvain Simon |
| Asmodée, demon | tenor | Alexis Dupont |
| Drack, demon | baritone | Ferdinand Prévôt |
| Bélial, demon | tenor | Jean-Étienne-Auguste Massol |
| Baal, demon | bass | Charles-Louis Pouilley |
| Samiel, demon | tenor | Hyacinthe-M. Trévaux |
| Moloc, demon | bass | Auguste-Hyacinth Hurteaux |
| Mammon, demon | tenor | François Wartel |
| Belzébuth, demon | bass | Prosper Dérivis |
| Urian, demon | singer | M. Sambet |
| Validé, a favorite of the sultan | dancer | Lise Noblet |
| Léila, a favorite of the sultan | dancer | Pauline Paul Montessu |
| Amidé, a favorite of the sultan | dancer | (Odile-Daniel) Julia de Varennes |
| Effémi, a favorite of the sultan | mezzo-soprano | Constance Jawureck |
| Gulliéaz, a favorite of the sultan | dancer | Mme (Alexis) Dupont |
| A monster | dancer | Mlle Keppler |
| Alaédan, sultan of Iconium | dancer | Simon Mérante |
Chorus; Act 1: 25 shepherds, demons (all the men), 8 angels, 15 female peasants Act 2: demons (entire chorus); Act 3: huntsmen, 3 trumpeters, 4 lords, 20 cooks, 13 angels and pilgrims Act 4: (entire chorus); Act 5: (entire chorus); Part 2: demons (all the men), angels (all the women).
Corps de ballet Act 1: 2 fiancés, 11 shepherds, 12 peasant women, 4 children Act 2: 7 Capital Sins, Astaroth's army (14 captains, drum-major, music conductor, 10 gunners, 23 men,13 little he-devils, 36 women, 12 little she-devils); Act 3: 12 whippers-in, 18 pages of the hunt Act 4: 40 harem women, 2 matrons, 6 black eunuchs Act 5: 8 subjects of Astaroth; Part 1: dancing master, fencing master, painter, poet, cook, ogre, she-devil, page, merchant, female magician Part 2: demons (all the men), angels (all the women).

== Synopsis ==
=== Act 1 ===
An oriental desert close to a hermitage

The hermit prays to free himself from temptation; he is apparently struck dead by lightning when lusting after the pilgrim Marie. Whilst angels and demons debate his fate, he revives and flees.

=== Act 2 ===
The interior of a volcano

Astaroth and the demons plot a revenge against the hermit. In one of the most popular scenes of the opera, they create the temptress Miranda, who rises (apparently naked) from a cauldron which has previously produced a grisly monster. Miranda is marked by a black spot on her heart. The demons are dispersed by an angel on a meteor.

=== Act 3 ===
In a deserted park

The hermit is starving. Astaroth appears with the demoness Miranda to tempt him, offering bread for his cross. However Miranda is moved by the hermit's prayer and kneels; the spot vanishes.

=== Act 4 ===
A magnificent harem by the seashore

The hermit is attracted by the beautiful dancers of the harem, who prevent Miranda from joining their revels. The hermit is told that by murdering the Sultan he can take over the harem; but Miranda prevents him.

=== Act 5 ===
An oriental desert close to a hermitage

The hermit finds Marie in his hermitage. Miranda joins Marie in prayer, although she has been commanded to seduce the hermit. Astaroth and his legions undertake various diabolic actions, including the murder of Miranda. However, angels take the hermit to heaven.

== Costume gallery ==
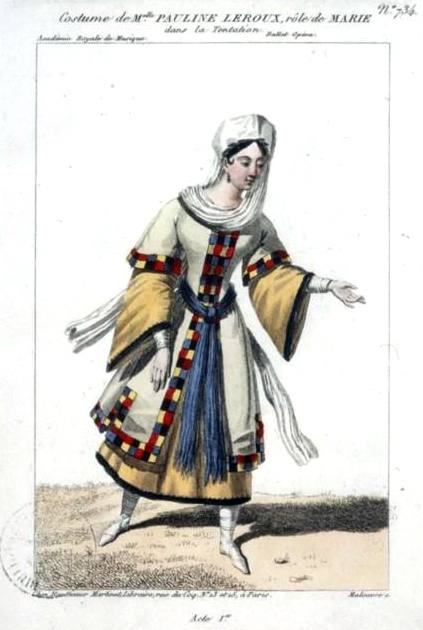
Leroux as Marie

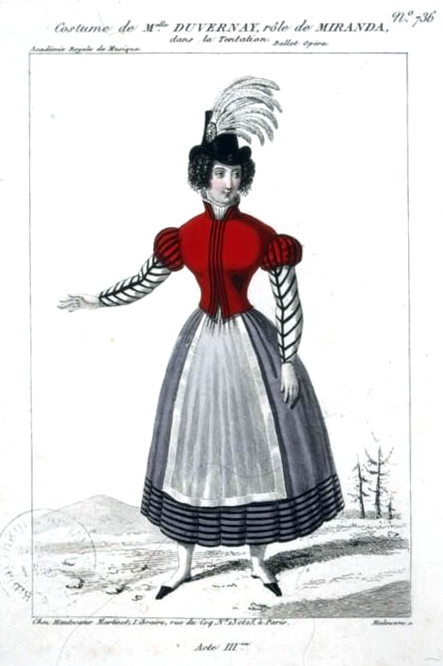
Duvernay as Miranda (Act 3)

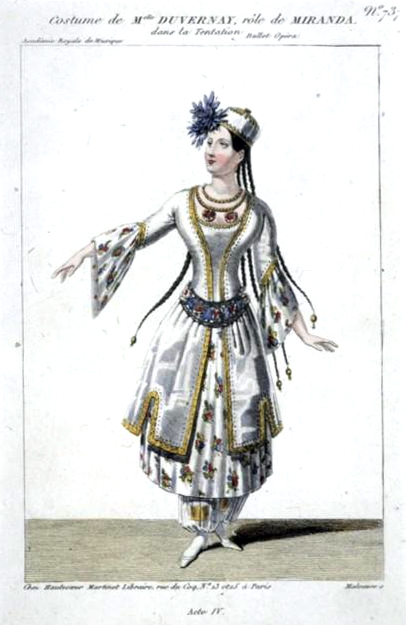
Duvernay as Miranda (Act 4)

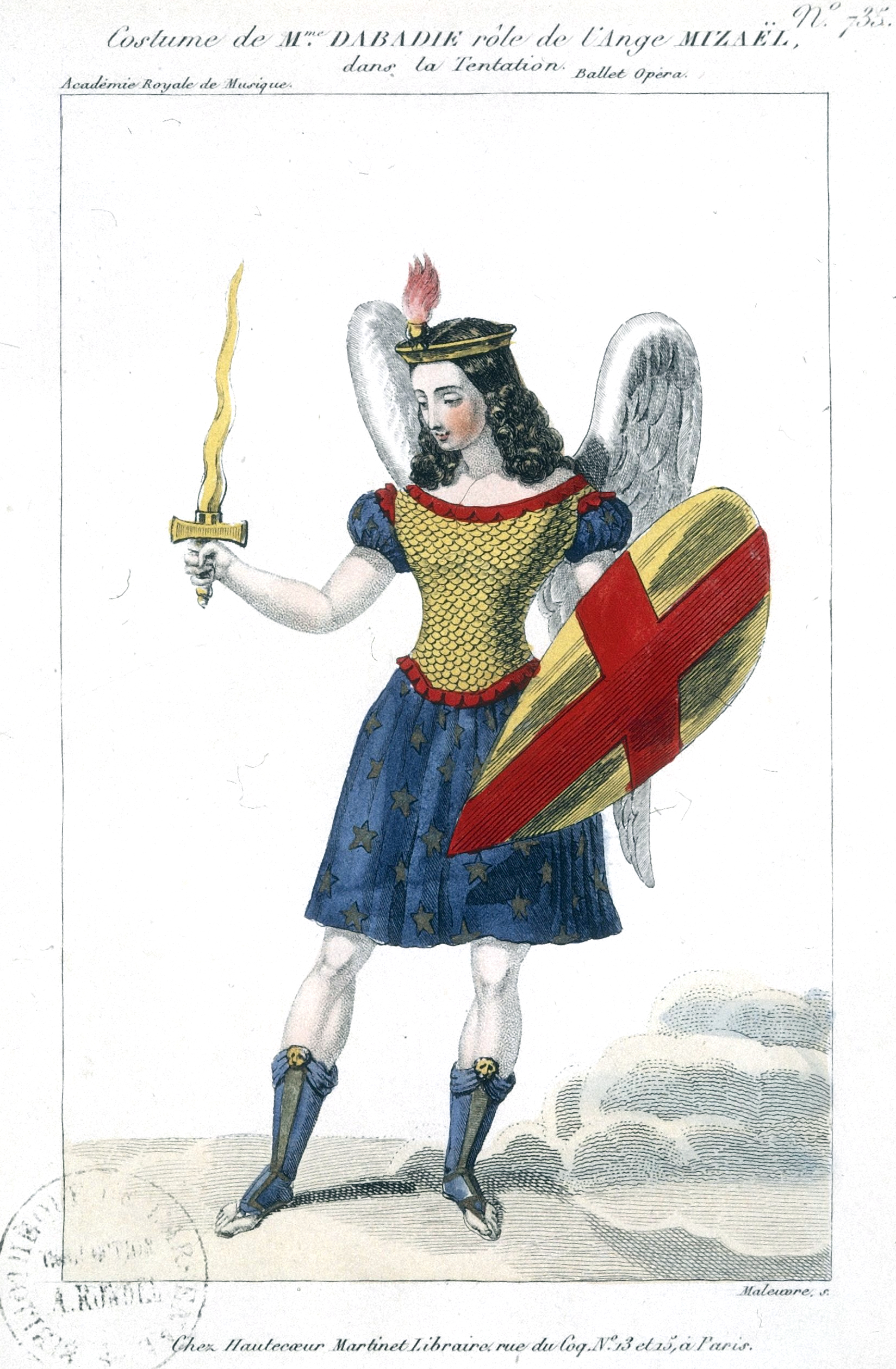
Dabadie as Mizaël
