= Hygin-Auguste Cavé =

French attorney and government official (1796–1852)

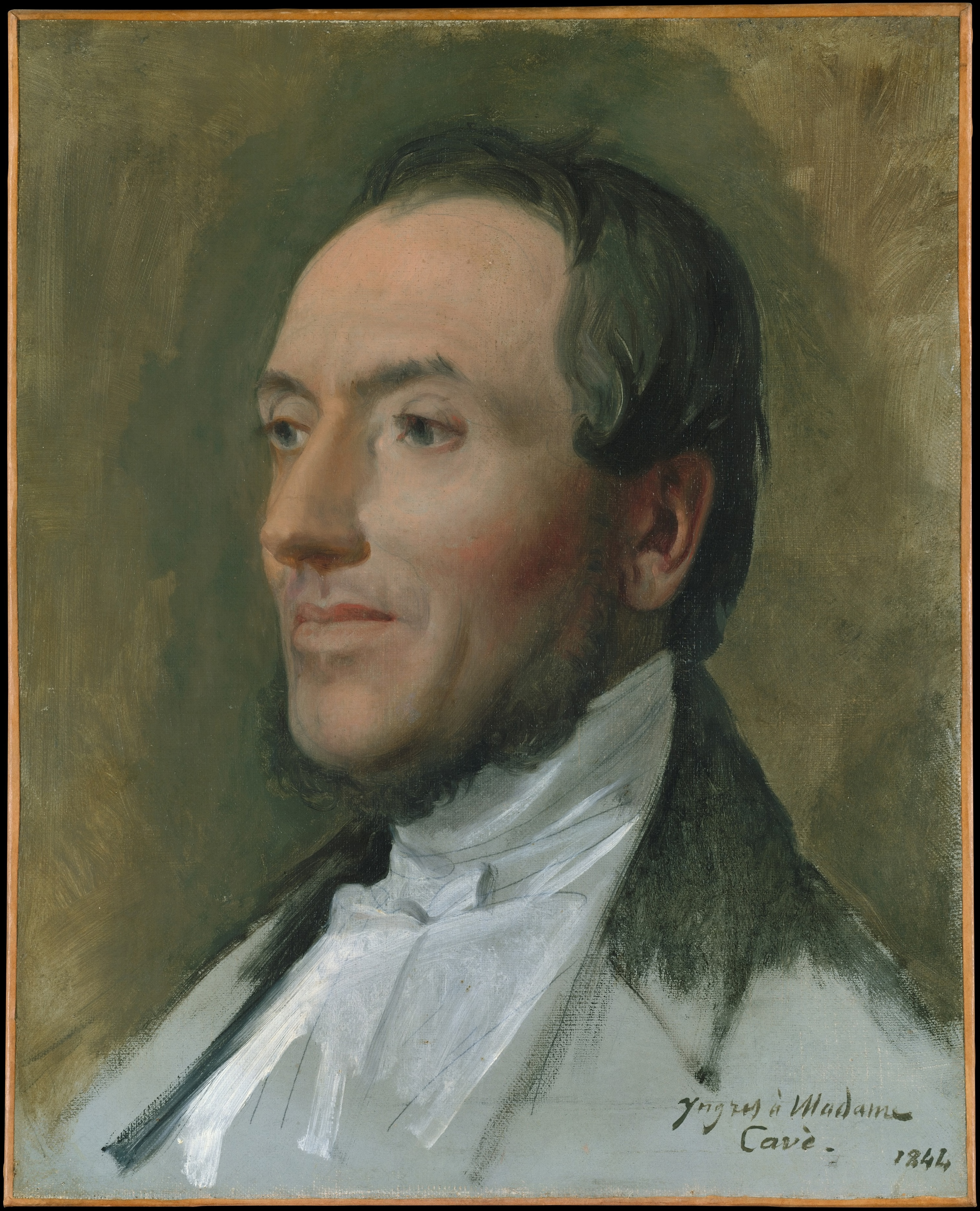
Hygin-Auguste Cavé (1844 portrait by Ingres)

Hygin-Edmond-Ludovic-Auguste Cavé (8 October 1796 – 30 March 1852) was a French attorney, journalist, and government official, as well as an occasional playwright and librettist, who often collaborated with Adolphe Dittmer under the pseudonym Jacques François de Fongeray. He is also sometimes referred to as Edmond Cavé. He is perhaps best known as the subject of a portrait by the French artist Ingres, which is on display at New York's Metropolitan Museum of Art.

== Biography ==
According to information in the records of the Légion d'Honneur, he was born Ygin-Auguste Cavé in Doudeville, Seine-Maritime, to Thomas-Romain Cavé, a merchant wholesaler, and Françoise-Louise Derotté Guilbert. He first worked as an attorney in Rouen.

In Paris he became a member of the "Aide-toi, le ciel t'aidera" (a society founded in August 1827, which supported constitutional monarchy), and a writer for Le Globe, a political journal which had been a mouthpiece for the Independents during the period of the Restoration. At Le Globe he became friends with Adolphe Dittmer (1795–1846), and he and Dittmer, using the single pseudonym Jacques François de Fongeray, published an anthology of "dramatic and historical sketches" with the title Les Soirées de Neuilly (1827). They also co-wrote several vaudeville sketches. In 1832 Cavé collaborated with Henri Duponchel, the future director of the Paris Opera, on the libretto for Halévy's 5-act ballet-opera La tentation. And from 28 January to 17 October 1838 Cavé served as the acting Royal Commissioner for the Comédie-Française.

On 18 October 1832, during Louis Philippe's reign (1830–1848), Cavé first secured a job with the government, as a general secretary in the Ministry of the Interior. Then in 1833 he became the Director of the Division of Fine Arts, a post he held until 1848. On 12 October 1839 he was also named maître des requêtes, a high level judicial position in the Conseil d'État (Council of State). His area of responsibility was in the Special Service of the Committee of the Interior, an appointment he retained until the Special Service was dissolved on 18 April 1848 during the upheaval of the 1848 Revolution. After Louis-Napoléon Bonaparte's coup in December 1851, which resulted in the termination of the Second Republic, Cavé was able to rejoin the government and was made Directeur des Palais et Manufactures (Director of Palaces and Factories) in January 1852. He died soon thereafter, at the end of March, in Paris.

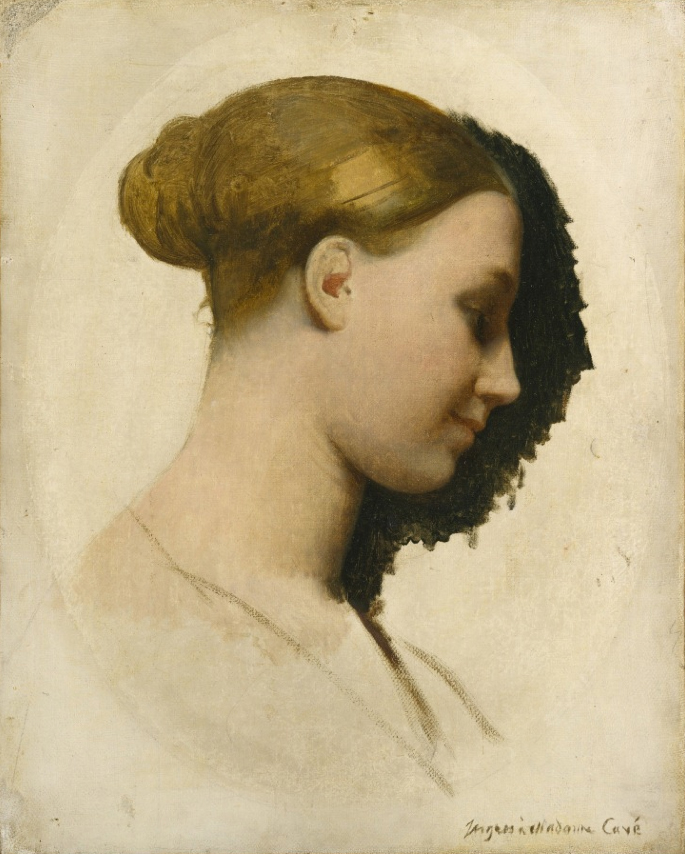
Mme Cavé, c. 1831–34 (portrait by Ingres)

On 4 November 1843 Cavé had married Marie-Élisabeth Blavot-Boulanger (April 1806 – 15 October 1883). She was an artist, who had studied with, and previously been married to, Clément Boulanger (who died in 1842), and she exhibited her artwork regularly at the Salon in Paris. Through his wife, Cavé became acquainted with Boulanger's former teacher Ingres, as well as Delacroix and Gigoux. In 1844 he commissioned Ingres to paint his portrait, which was apparently intended to be a companion piece to Ingres's earlier portrait of Mme Cavé.

His wife's son from her first marriage was Marie-Henry-Albert Boulanger-Cavé (born 1830 in Rome, died 1910), who became a theatre supervisor in the Ministry of the Interior during the Second Empire.

== Honors ==
- Chevalier of the Legion of Honour (1 May 1831)
- Officier of the Legion of Honor (12 December 1844)
