= Louis Henry =

Louis Henry may refer to:

- Louis Henry (historian) (1911–1991), French historian
- Louis Henry (choreographer) (1784–1836), French dancer and choreographer
- Louis Henry, Count Palatine of Simmern-Kaiserslautern (1640–1674)
- Louis Henry, Prince of Nassau-Dillenburg (1594–1662)
