= Madame Cavé =

French painter and drawing professor (d. 1883)

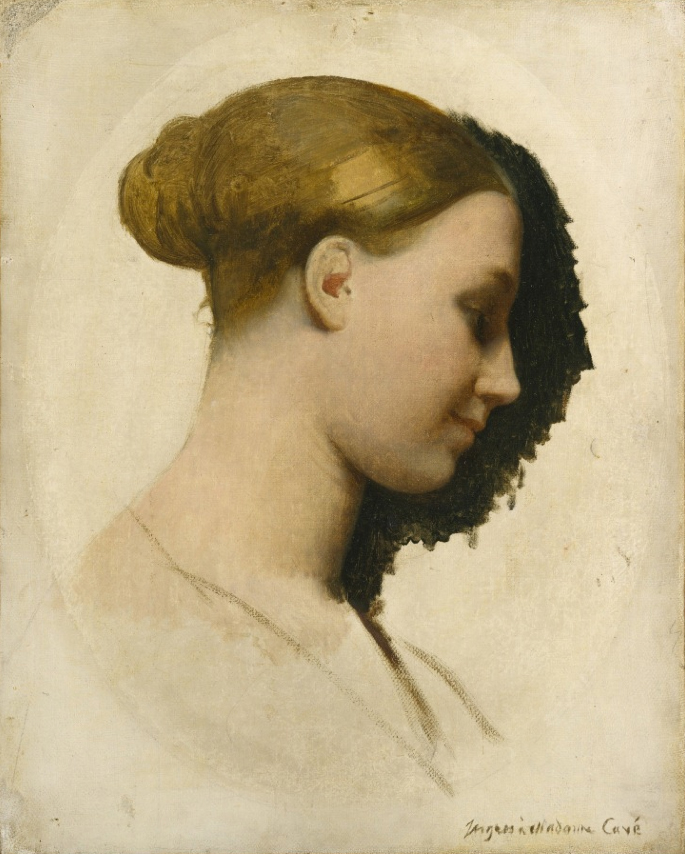
- Cavé c. 1831–1834 by Ingres (MMA)
- Born: Marie-Élisabeth Blavot; 1809 or 1810; Paris, France
- Died: 1883; Neuilly-sur-Seine, France
- Education: By Clément Boulanger and Camille Roqueplan
- Style: Romanticism
- Spouse(s): Clément Boulanger; Hygin-Auguste Cavé

Madame Cavé (1806, 1809 or 1810, – 1883) was a French painter and drawing professor. Born Marie-Élisabeth Blavot and also known as Marie Monchablon in her youth (from her mother's name), she married the painter Clément Boulanger and then, after Boulanger's death, Edmond Cavé—whom she also outlived.

Known as Madame Cavé during the July Monarchy due to her husband's official duties, she was equally friendly with Neoclassicist admirers of Ingres and with Romantic painters such as Delacroix, with whom she was friends. After she was widowed, she taught drawing to young women and published two teaching pamphlets on drawing and colour during the Second French Empire. She later also published reflections on women's conduct and place in society.

== Life ==
Born in Paris, she was the daughter of rentiers, and her family was related to that of Charles Leclerc, first husband of Pauline Bonaparte. She was raised at a boarding school for young girls, where she learned drawing and watercolour under Camille Roqueplan, then genre painting under Clément Boulanger, a student of Jean-Auguste-Dominique Ingres, who painted Boulanger's portrait around 1830. She and Boulanger married in 1831—they had had a son together in Rome the previous year named Albert.

Cautious, beautiful and charming, she managed to live an independent life and her career as a painter continued without interruption until 1855. From 1836 she gave lessons in drawing and painting in a school for young girls. In 1833 she met Eugène Delacroix at a ball—four years later he offered her a small painting, Charles Quint at the Monastery of Yuste (18 x 26 cm). She and Delacroix travelled to Flanders together in 1839 and they remained close until his death.

Her husband was appointed artist to Charles Texier's archaeological mission, which was sent to excavate Magnesia ad Sipylum (now Manisa in Turkey). He died there on 28 September 1842 and the following year she married Edmond Cavé, twelve years her senior. She continued teaching and writing, gaining a certain notoriety under the name Madame Cavé and obtaining several official commissions to produce paintings for churches. Although her husband's position between 1843 and 1852 certainly proved useful to her artistic career, it was not the decisive influence upon it as some writers have argued. She effectively exhibited at the Paris Salon and gained critical acclaim before her marriage to Cavé and her career and official commissions continued after the 1848 French Revolution had cost Cavé his post and after Cavé's death in 1852. Other authors attribute her notoriety to her intimate relationship with Delacroix, though this too can be argued against—she was in contact with the whole artistic milieu of her era and able to understand her artistic contemporaries as an artist herself.

=== Painting ===
She exhibited at the Paris Salon several times and gained quite a favourable critical reputation, though critics praised her for not stepping beyond her rôle and talent as a woman. She herself wrote in 1850 "for too often ideas of great painting, of history painting, as it's called in our own times, come to trouble [the minds of young girls]. The ambition to equal men, to compete with them, destroys them." In 1847 she exhibited paintings of children—"its touch is light and its colour luminous—she likes beautiful shimmering fabrics and coquettish adjustments, and the luxury of ornaments of the old courts". In 1863 she exhibited "lively watercolours, in high colour and with a wholly masculine energy" at the permanent exhibition organised from that year onwards.

=== Teaching ===
She initially wrote a work on artistic training, Le dessin sans maître (1850), which explained the Cavé Method, which she said she had used since 1847. It aimed to exercise visual memory, a basic aptitude necessary for drawing. Delacroix wrote a favourable review in the Revue des deux Mondes of September 1850. A commission examined the method in 1850 and decided in favour of it and Lecoq's method (inspired by the same concept). The Minister of Public Education trialled Cavé's method in normal primary schools in Caen and Douai in 1862 and later the same year in those in Chartres. The results were judged to be satisfactory enough to recommend adopting the method in other normal schools. The assessors' arguments in favour of drawing training did not change the fact that they saw it as a pastime rather than an industrial skill—it is still impossible to say how far these methods were applied, if not by their inventors.

Madame Cavé then wrote L'aquarelle sans maître (Watercolour Without a Master), in which she discussed colour. These two small books combined a learning method, practical advice, reflections on the theoretical order of arts and crafts and moral treatments of women's place in society. The works she published later did not contain moral discussions—after she was widowed she became a more and more fervent Roman Catholic, in a way similar to other figures born during the First Empire.

She died in Neuilly-sur-Seine.

=== Charity work ===
Aged 60, she seems to have abandoned painting and in 1866 she founded a society aiming to relieve women who had fallen into poverty and "were not used to the misery" of living off a wage—this was known as the "Corporation des abeilles" ("the Corporation of Bees"). They were able to produce "ouvrages de dame" (i.e. artworks suitable for women to produce) which could then be sold to society figures.

== Appearances in fiction ==
Alexandre Dumas (père) made her a character in one of the chapters of his memoirs, published between 1852 and 1856, in which he interwove some facts agreeing with historical documents with other contradictory, incoherent and mostly unverifiable ones. He portrayed her as a mad romantic young woman, a married artist and cousin of her first husband Boulanger, to whom Dumas dedicated the chapter. It was initially published in Dumas' journal Le Mousquetaire9 December 1853 then in the review L'Artiste in 1856.

== Works ==
=== Watercolours ===
- Conversation around the bed (attributed to her), Musée Magnin, Dijon
- The Final Moments (attributed to her), Musée Magnin, Dijon

=== Drawings ===
- The Battle of Ivry, Musée du Louvre
- Louis XIII, winner of a tournament at the Louvre, Musée du Louvre

=== Paintings ===
- The Vision of the Virgin, Musée des Beaux-Arts de Rouen
- The Dormition of the Virgin, Musée des Beaux-Arts de Rouen

=== Illustrations ===
- For François de Harlay (par l'ordre de Monseigneur), Catéchisme, ou Abrégé de la foi, L. Curmer, 1842

=== Books ===
- Cours de dessin sans maître, Paris, [s.d.], In-fol.
- Le Dessin sans maître, méthode pour apprendre à dessiner de mémoire, Paris : Susse frères, 1850, in-8°, VIII-82 p., front. et pl. gravés; 2° ed. Paris:Aubert 1852, 3° ed. Paris : Aubert 1852; 4e éd., Paris : bureau du "Journal amusant", 1857. In-8°, 134 p.; Abrégé de la méthode Cavé pour apprendre à dessiner, Paris : H. Plon, (1860), in-12°, 71 p.; Abrégé de la méthode Cavé pour apprendre à dessiner... précédé des rapports de l'inspecteur général des beaux-arts (F. Cottereau) et de M. Delacroix, Paris : H. Plon, (1862), in-12°, 71 p.
  - Drawing from memory, translated from the 4th edition of Dessin sans maître, New York: Putnam & son, 1869
- L'Aquarelle sans maître, méthode pour apprendre l'harmonie des couleurs (2e partie du Dessin sans maître), Paris : impr. de N. Chaix, 1851, in-8°, XIII-132 p., front. et pl. gravés; 2° ed. Paris : Philippon fils, 1856, in-8°, 132 p., fig; 3° éd. titrée La Couleur (Ouvrage approuvé par M. Eugène Delacroix pour apprendre la peinture à l'huile et à l'aquarelle), Paris : H. Plon, 1863
- La Religion dans le monde, conseils à ma filleule, Paris : H. Plon, 1855, in-12°, 212 p. et pl.; 2e éd. ibid., 1862.
- La Femme aujourd'hui, la femme autrefois, Paris : H. Plon, 1863, in-8°, VI-288 p. et front. gravé.
- Beauté physique de la femme, Paris : P. Leloup, (1868), in-32°, 128 p.
- La Vierge Marie et la femme, Paris : C. Dillet, 1875
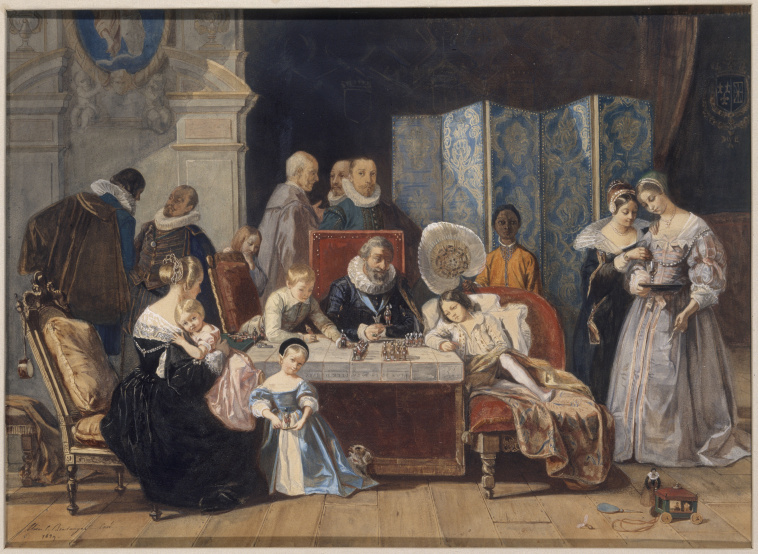
The Battle of Ivry.

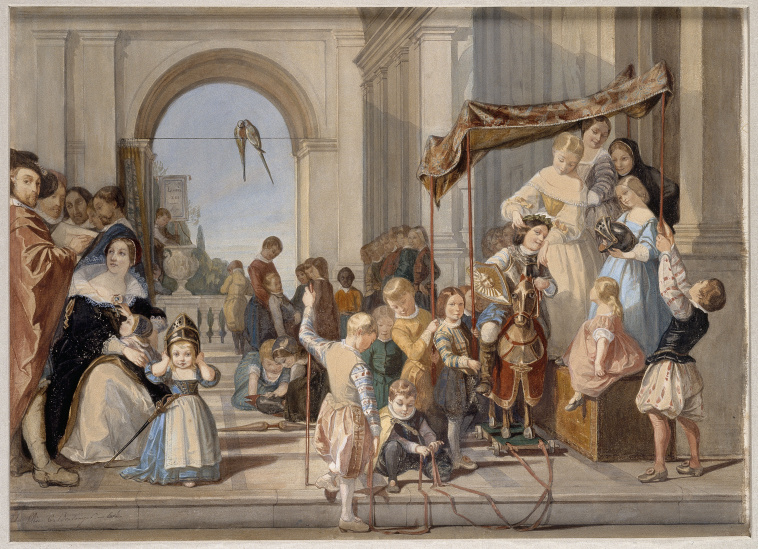
Louis XIII, winner of a tournament at the Louvre.

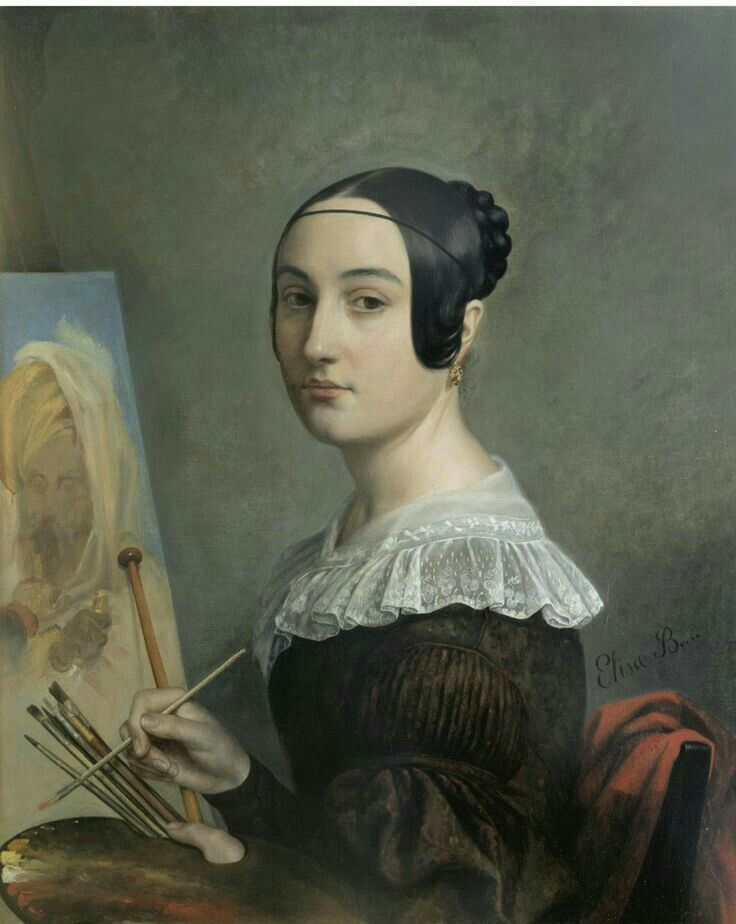
Madame Cavé.

== Bibliography ==
- Angrand, Pierre (1966). Marie-Elizabeth Cavé, disciple de Delacroix (in French). [Lausanne, Paris]: La Bibliothèque des arts. OCLC 754554315.
- Joubin, André (January 1930). "Deux amies de Delacroix". La revue de l'Art ancien et moderne (in French). LVII (312): 57–94.
- Tinterow, Gary; Conisbee, Philip, eds. (1999). Portraits by Ingres : image of an epoch. New York: Metropolitan Museum of Art : Distributed by Harry N. Abrams. OCLC 856655718.
