= Luigi Carlini =

19th-century Italian opera composer

- Born: Luigi Carlini c. 1795; Naples, Campania, Italy
- Died: Milan, Italy
- Occupation: Composer

Luigi Carlini was an Italian composer specializing in opera, with a career centered in Milan in the 19th century.

== Life and career ==
Luigi Carlini was born in Naples, Campania, Italy in the late 18th century.

Luigi Carlini's Maria Stuarda, regina di Scozia, a cultural depiction of Mary, Queen of Scots, was his debut opera. The production was adapted from a 1802 drama by Camillo Federici, titled The Triumph of the Carbonari (Italian: Il Trionfo Dei Carbonari).

In September 1817, Carlini presented a two-act drama featuring Luigi Lablache, Giovanni David, and Luigi Sirletti. The composer premiered the opera The Youth of Henry V (Italian: La gioventù di Enrico V) in 1819 at the Teatro Nuovo sopra Toledo in Naples, featuring a libretto by Italian poet Felice Romani. He returned with a production of Solimano II, or The Three Sultanas (Italian: Solimano II, ossia Le tre sultane) at Teatro San Carlo in 1820, collaborating with Andrea Leone Tottola and Charles-Simon Favart. Carlini premiered Adelaide di Baviera at Teatro San Carlo in 1821 with libretto provided by Andrea Leone Tottola. In collaboration with Austrian composer Robert Gallenberg, he contributed to the musical composition of Niobe by Italian choreographer Gaetano Gioja, later staged at Naples' Teatro di San Carlo in January 1822. That year, Carlini also composed music for The Festival of Terpsichore (Italian: La Festa Di Tersicore), a work choreographed by Italian ballet-master Salvatore Taglioni.

He produced the 1823 Reciprocation, or Love Put to the Test (Italian: Il contraccambio, ovvero L'amore alla prova) which premiered at Teatro del Fondo. His version of the opera based on Francesca da Rimini was created in 1825 with Felice Romani. The piece served as the first musical version of Francesca da Rimini offered to the Italian public. In 1828, he premiered The Fleeing Spouses (Italian: Gli sposi fuggitivi), a collaboration with Italian composer Giuseppe Ceccherini. On 28 May 1828, Luigi Carlini composed the music of La Sylphide for Louis Henry which was premiered at La Scala in Milan.

Carlini provided the score for Chao-Kang, an 1834 ballet-pantomime staged by French choreographer Louis Henry at the Théâtre Nautique. A specific section, the "Gallop of the lanterns," was arranged for German pianist Friedrich Kalkbrenner. He also collaborated with French composer Casimir Gide to compose the music for L'île des pirates of Louis Henry which premiered on 12 August 1835 at the Opéra de Paris.

== Death ==
Luigi Carlini died in Italy in the 19th century.
