= Louis-Stanislas Montjoie =

French ballet dancer (1789–1865)

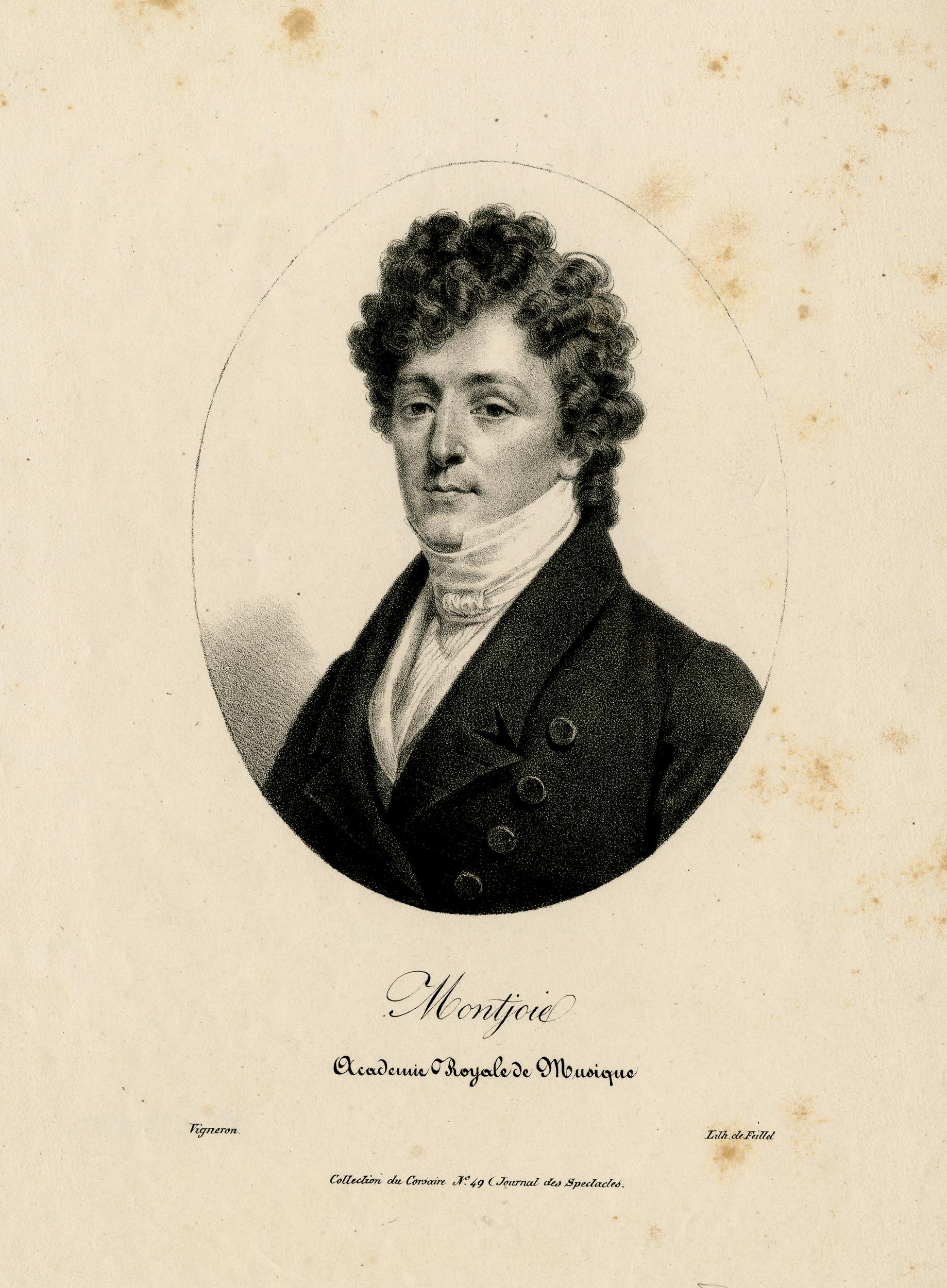
- Born: Louis-Stanislas Montjoie; 1789; Paris, France
- Died: 1865 (aged 75–76); Saint-Germain-en-Laye, France
- Occupations: Dancer; Actor

Louis-Stanislas Montjoie (1789 – 1865) was an 18th-century French ballet dancer and actor who performed in opéra-ballets at the Opéra de Paris.

== Early life ==
Named after Louis XVIII, Louis-Stanislas Montjoie (or Montjoye) was born in Paris, France in 1789.

== Entertainment life ==
Louis-Stanislas Montjoie studied in Paris and was a pupil of Jean-François Coulon. Before his debut at the Académie royale de musique (known as Paris Opera), he was at risk of being diverted from dance toward a career in tragedy. While performing in Le Bourgeois gentilhomme at the Comédie-Française, the renowned actor Fleury, impressed by Montjoie's noble bearing and striking appearance, attempted to persuade him to pursue acting instead, even offering to mentor him personally. Following guidance from Madame Vestris and Louis Milon, the Academy's assistant ballet-master, Montjoie debuted at the Royal Academy in 1809. He performed as Telemachus in a ballet choreographed by French ballet master Pierre Gardel called Télémaque.

In 1816, his son, painter and playwright Armand Montjoye was born in Paris.

By 1820, he received the title of first subject. He performed in many ballets produced at the Opéra de Paris. He played popular roles in Aline, reine de Golconde, The Barber of Seville, Le Page inconstant, Zémire et Azor, L'enfant prodigue, Proserpine, La somnambule (M. de Saint-Rambert), La Belle au bois dormant (Gannelor), Manon Lescaut (The Marquis de Gerville), La tentation, Nathalie, La Révolte au sérail, L'île des pirates, Le Diable boiteux (Captain Bellaspada), and La fille du Danube (Baron de Wilibald). Montjoie, wearing an Arabian costume, performed in the ballet Aladin, ou La lampe merveilleuse on 1822. He performed as Saint Phar in Jean Aumer's Aline, reine de Golconde, a ballet premiered on 1 October 1823 with music by Gustave Dugazon. On 20 June 1832, he danced as Astaroth, King of the Demons in Fromental Halévy's opera La tentation. He performed at the Opéra as Ackbar in the 1835 ballet-pantomime L'île des pirates.

In 1837, he starred as a nobleman and friend of the Duke in Clary, a Pantomime Ballet presented in three acts at the Académie royale de musique. That year, he retired.

== Death ==
Louis-Stanislas Montjoie died in Saint-Germain-en-Laye, France in 1865.

== Gallery ==
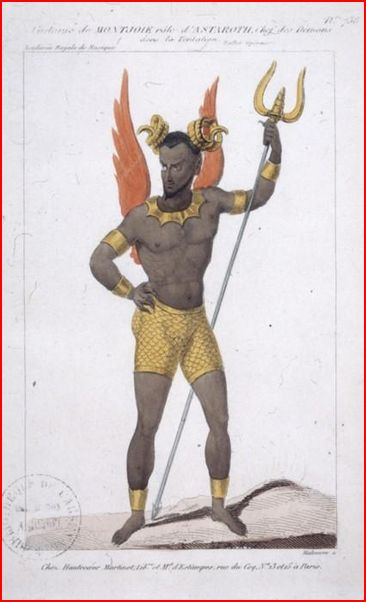
Montjoie in La tentation

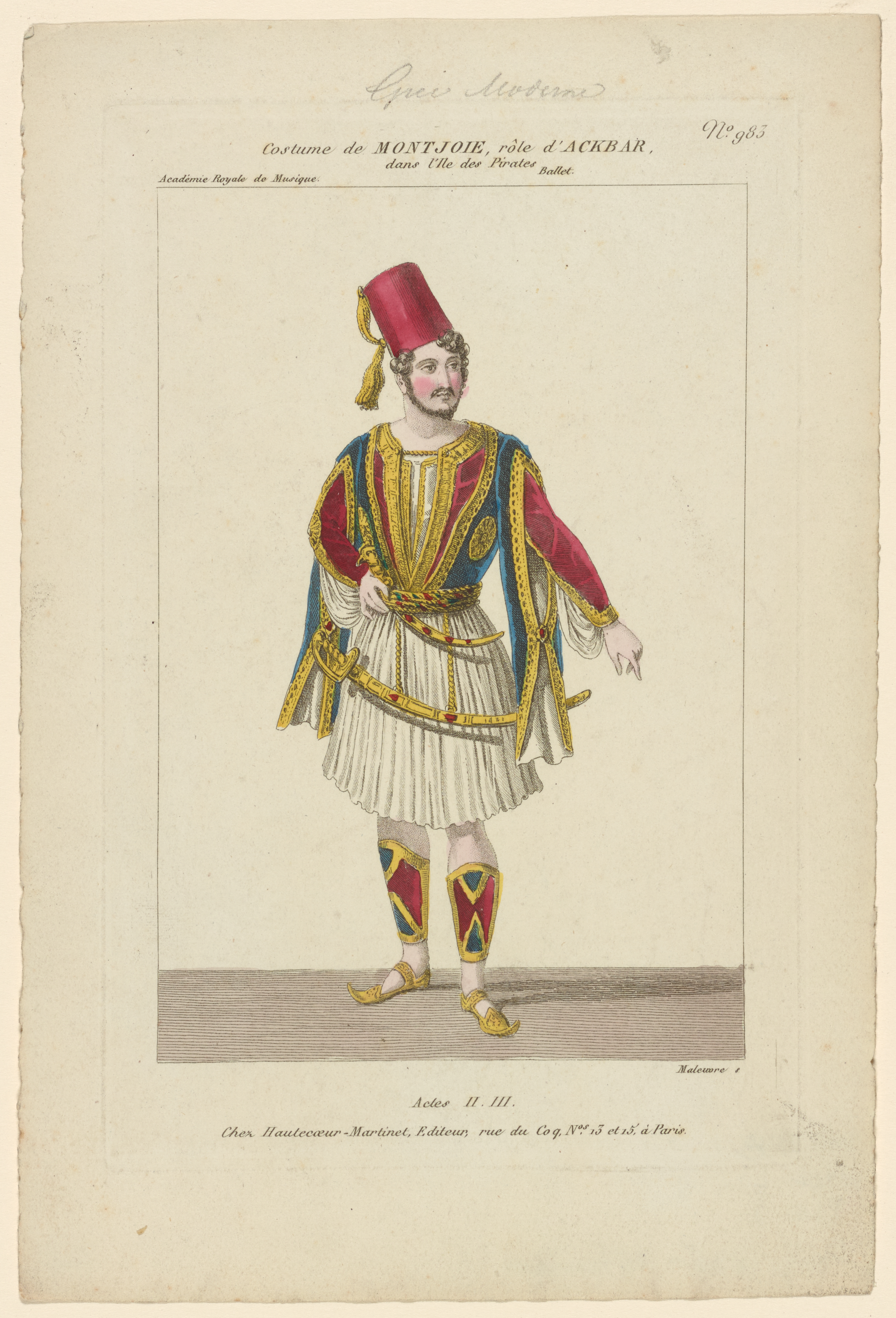
Montjoie in L'île des pirates

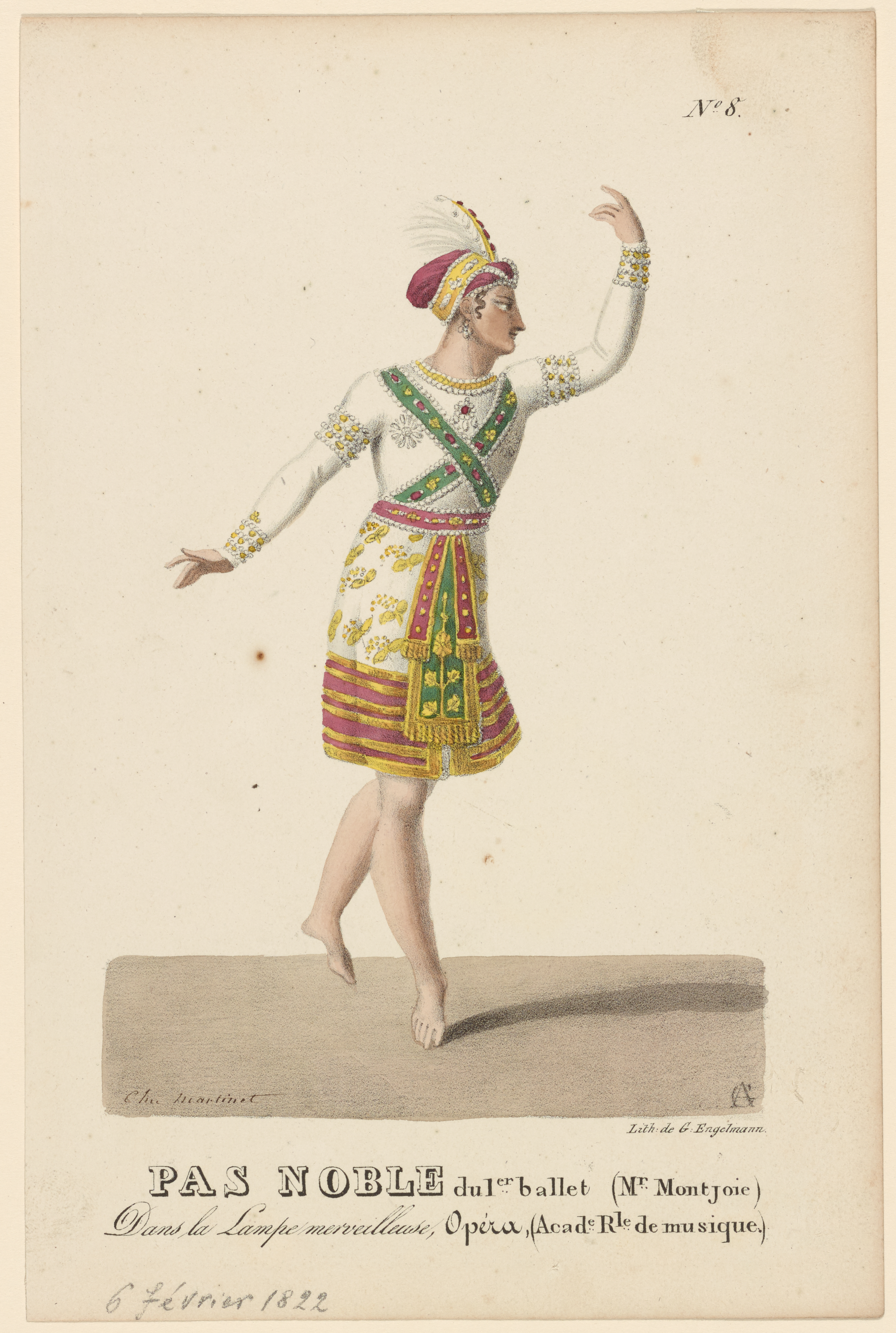
Montjoie in La lampe merveilleuse
