= Jean-Jacques Champin =

French painter

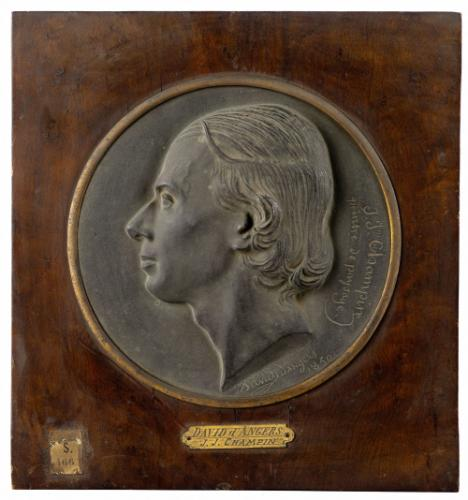
Jean-Jacques Champin, by David d'Angers (1850)

Jean-Jacques Champin (8 September 1796, Sceaux - 25 February 1860, Paris) was a French painter, watercolorist and lithographer.

== Biography ==
His father, Pierre, was an engraver and landscape painter who also served as mayor of Sceaux and helped to lay out the gardens of the Parc de Sceaux. He was also an admirer of Jean-Jacques Rousseau; hence his son's name. In addition to his father, he studied with Félix Storelli (1778-1854) and Jacques Auguste Regnier.

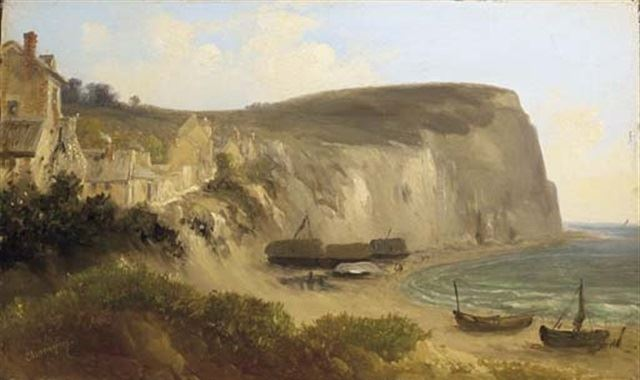
The Village and Cliffs of Yport

He married Céleste Biolay, with whom he had three children. Her delicate health forced them to live in Bourgogne until they moved in Paris in 1815. At that time, he became interested in what was then the new process of lithography. His first work in that medium was a view of the church in Sceaux.

He focused on historical landscapes, however and, to this end, took numerous trips to the Chartreuse Mountains (1823), the Pyrénées (1825) and Italy (1830). Together with Regnier, he created '' Picturesque views of the main castles and pleasure houses around Paris and the departments (1826), the Habitations of the most famous personages of France since 1790 until our day (1831-1835) and The Seine and its Surroundings (1836) and Historical Paris: Walks through the Streets of Paris (three volumes, 1838).

During this period, he was introduced to the literary salon at the Bibliothèque de l'Arsenal, where he became friends with many leading artists and writers; including David d'Angers, who would create a medal with his profile, and Charles Nodier, who wrote the preface to Habitations....

In 1835 Céleste died. Two years later, he married Élisa Honorine Petiet, a watercolorist and lithographer who specialized in floral still-lifes, and they had a daughter in 1840. Much of their time was spent visiting the estate of Napoléon Mortier de Trévise in Sceaux, where she worked on her paintings and he developed an interest in depicting the railroad that was being constructed through that area. He also provided illustrations for publications such as Le Magasin pittoresque and L'Illustration. During the 1850s, he produced some religious scenes.

His works may be seen at the Fogg Art Museum, Metropolitan Museum of Art, Musée Dauphinois, Musée d'art et d'histoire de Meudon, Musée Carnavalet and the Louvre, among many others.

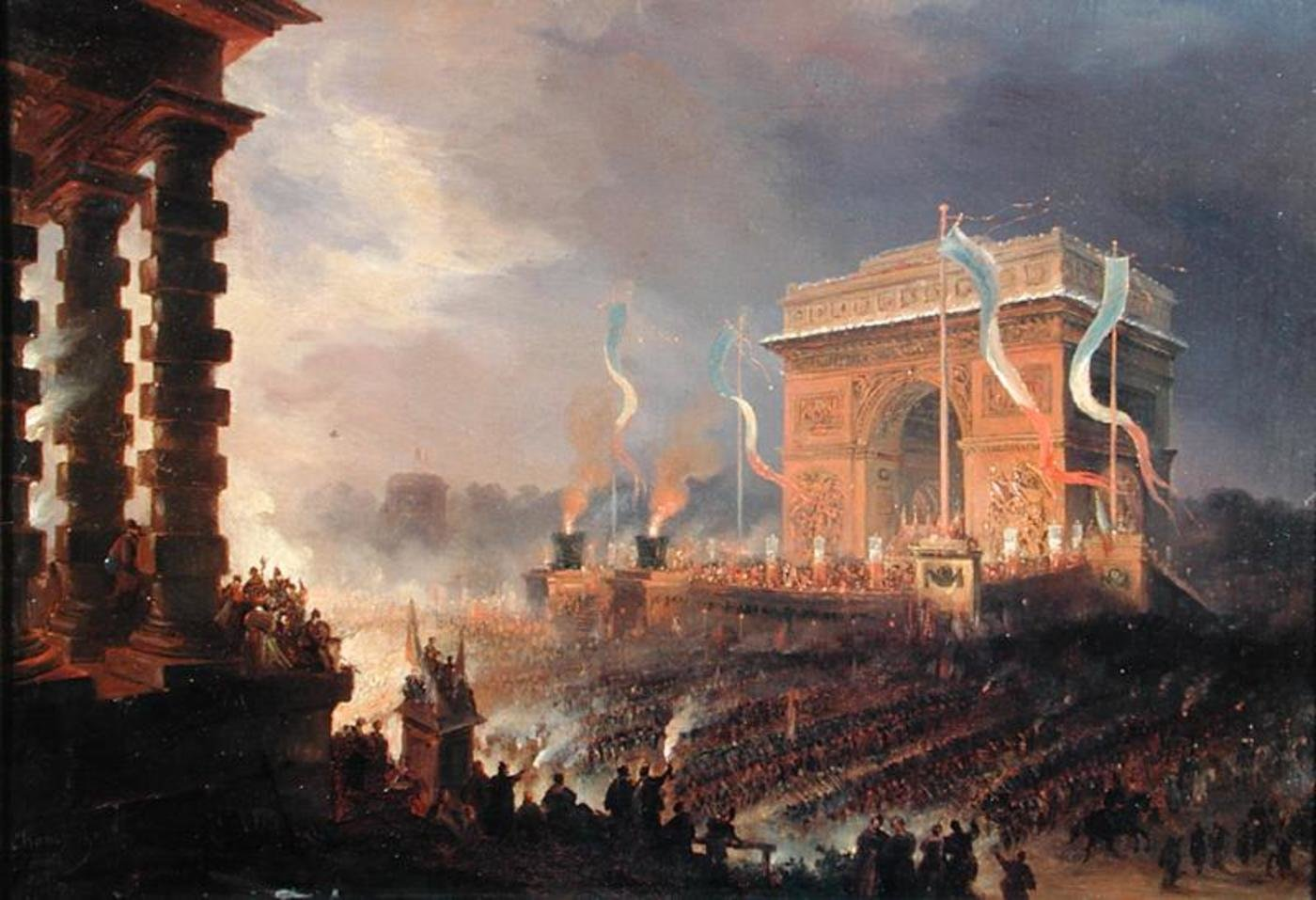
Festival of the Fraternity, Arc de Triomphe. (French Revolution of 1848)
