= Camille Roqueplan =

French painter (1802/03–1855)

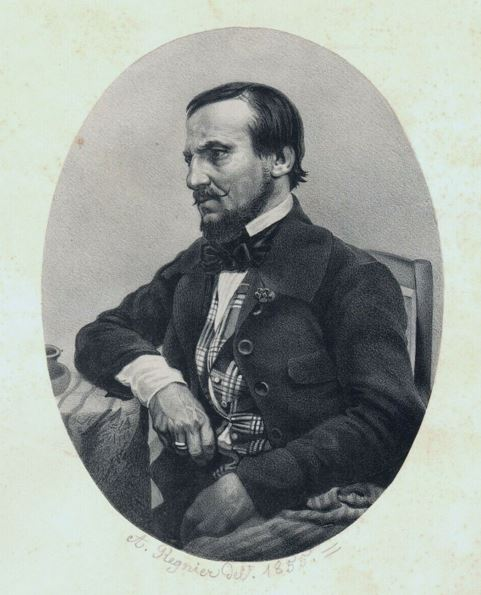
Camille Roqueplan; portrait lithograph by Jacques Auguste Regnier (1855)

Camille Joseph Etienne Roqueplan (18 February 1802/03 – 29 September 1855) was a French Romantic painter of landscapes, genre and historical scenes.

== Biography ==
He was born in Mallemort. From an early age, he displayed an aptitude for drawing, and would often correct his classmates. Around the age of eighteen, he began to take painting lessons. When his father encouraged him to take up art as a profession, Camille hesitated because he wanted it to remain a pleasant pastime, not become a job. Soon, the lessons he felt forced to take caused him disgust and he took up the study of medicine.

He got as far as the anatomy classes, which he found unappealing, and failed the examination. He then became a clerk in the Ministry of Finance, where his father worked, but this was also short-lived.

He decided to return to painting, studying landscape and figure drawing with some local artists. Following their advice, he found a position in the studios of Abel de Pujol at the École des Beaux-arts. One day, however, Pujol showed him a painting that he admired so much he despaired of ever being able to do as well and became discouraged enough to quit. It was only with great difficulty that his friends convinced him to continue. After leaving Pujol, he studied with Antoine Gros, who gave him very little encouragement, or even attention, but he remained with Gros for three years, perhaps because he was under less stress there.

After competing for the Prix de Rome, he decided to strike out on his own. At that time, he concentrated on landscape painting, which inspired him to take a trip to the Dauphiné. Many of his works are set there.

=== Later career ===
Upon his return to Paris, he held his first exhibit at the Salon of 1822, eventually winning a gold medal there. Despite his bad experiences as a student, he became a teacher at the École himself. Among his best-known students were Charles-Théodore Frère, Prosper Marilhat, Marie-Alexandre Alophe, Eugène Lami, Constant Troyon and Marie-Élisabeth Blavot. Later, in the 1830s, he produced historical paintings inspired by the novels of Walter Scott and painted battle-scenes at Versailles. In 1841, he created decorations for the ceiling of the library at the Palais du Luxembourg. From 1843, he returned to landscape painting and lived in the Pyrenees for several years for health reasons, where he produced scenes of peasant life. He died in Paris in 1855.

His brother Nestor was a writer and theatrical director.

== Gallery ==
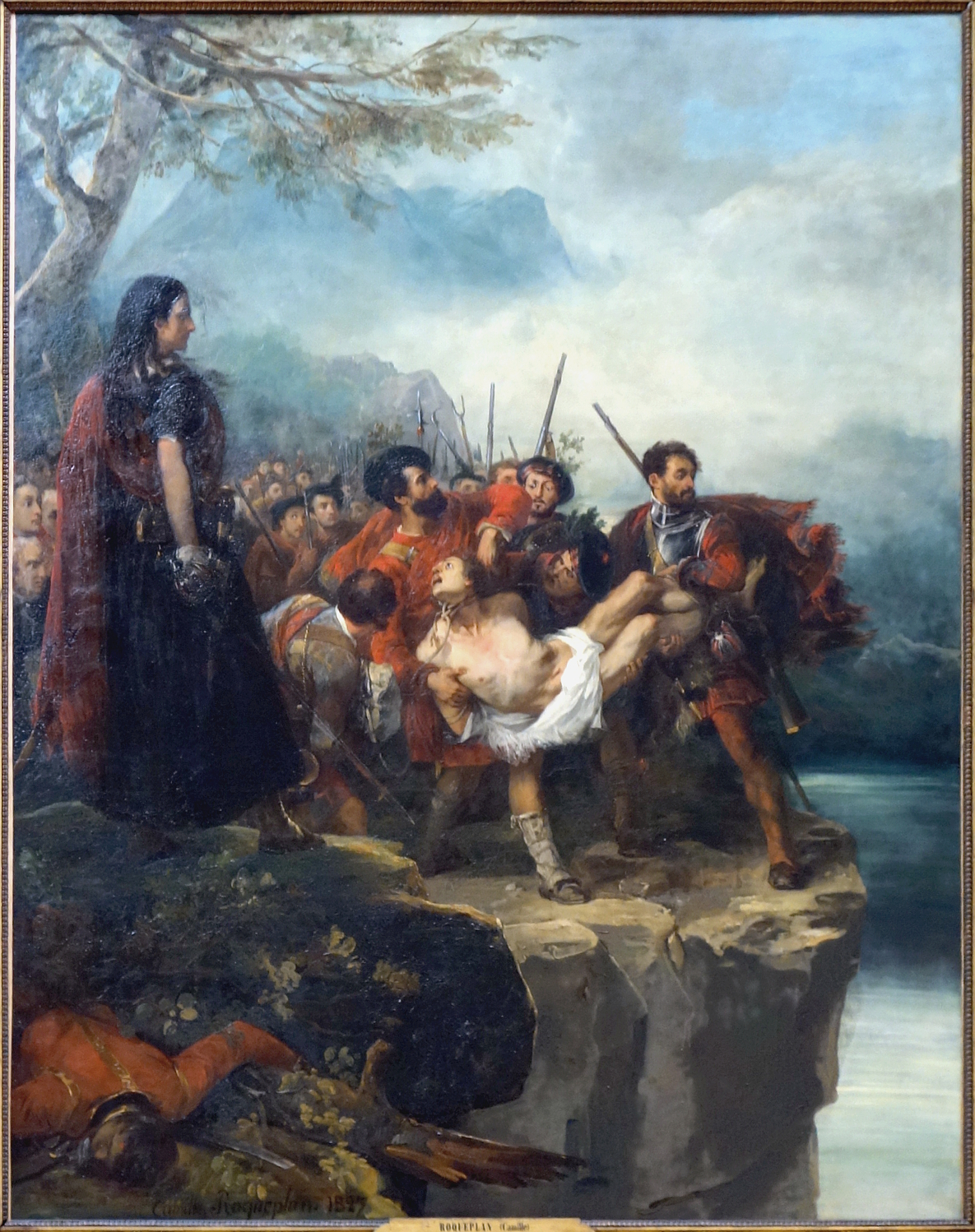
The Death of the Spy, Morris, 1827

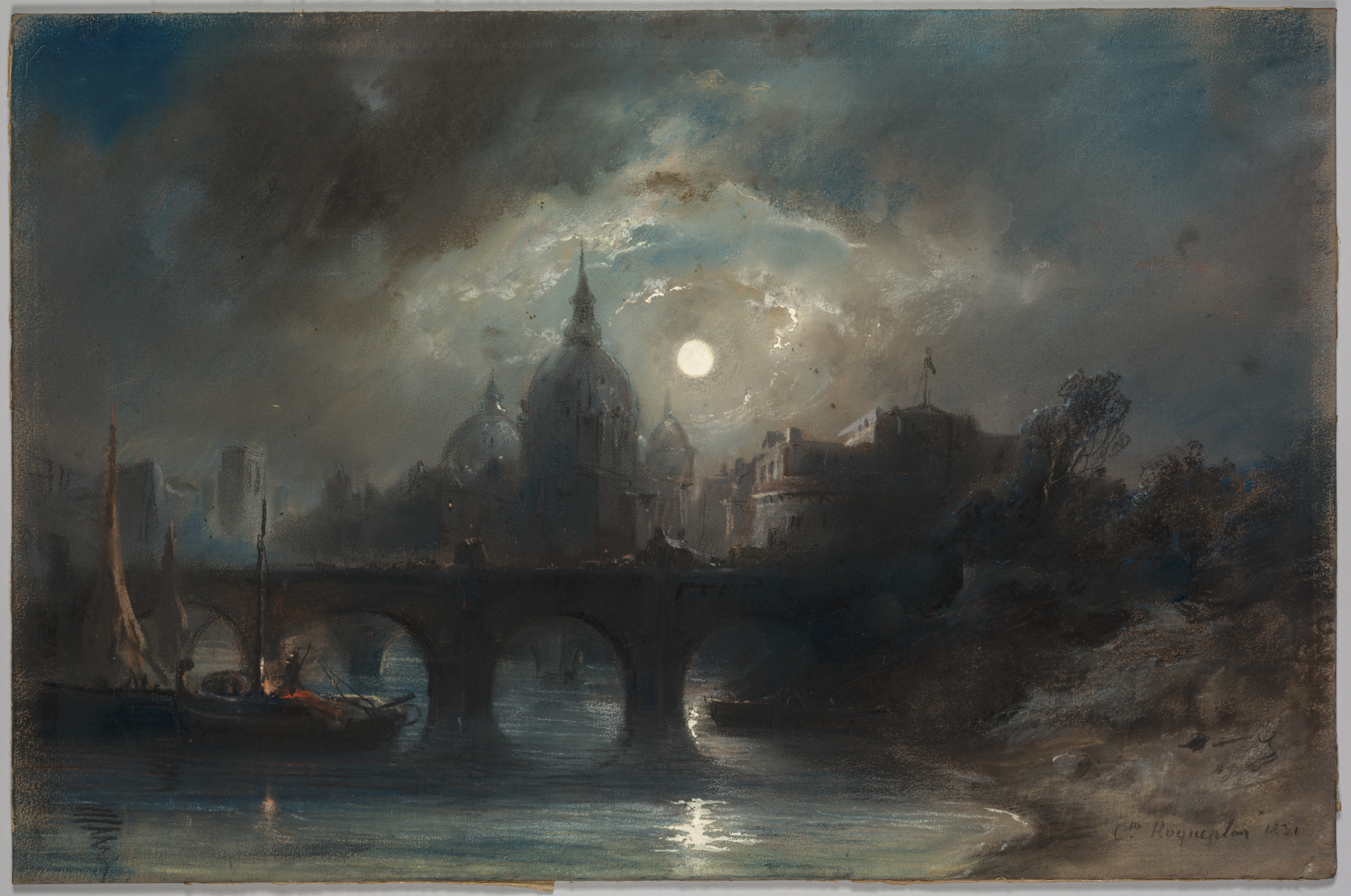
View of a City at Night, 1831

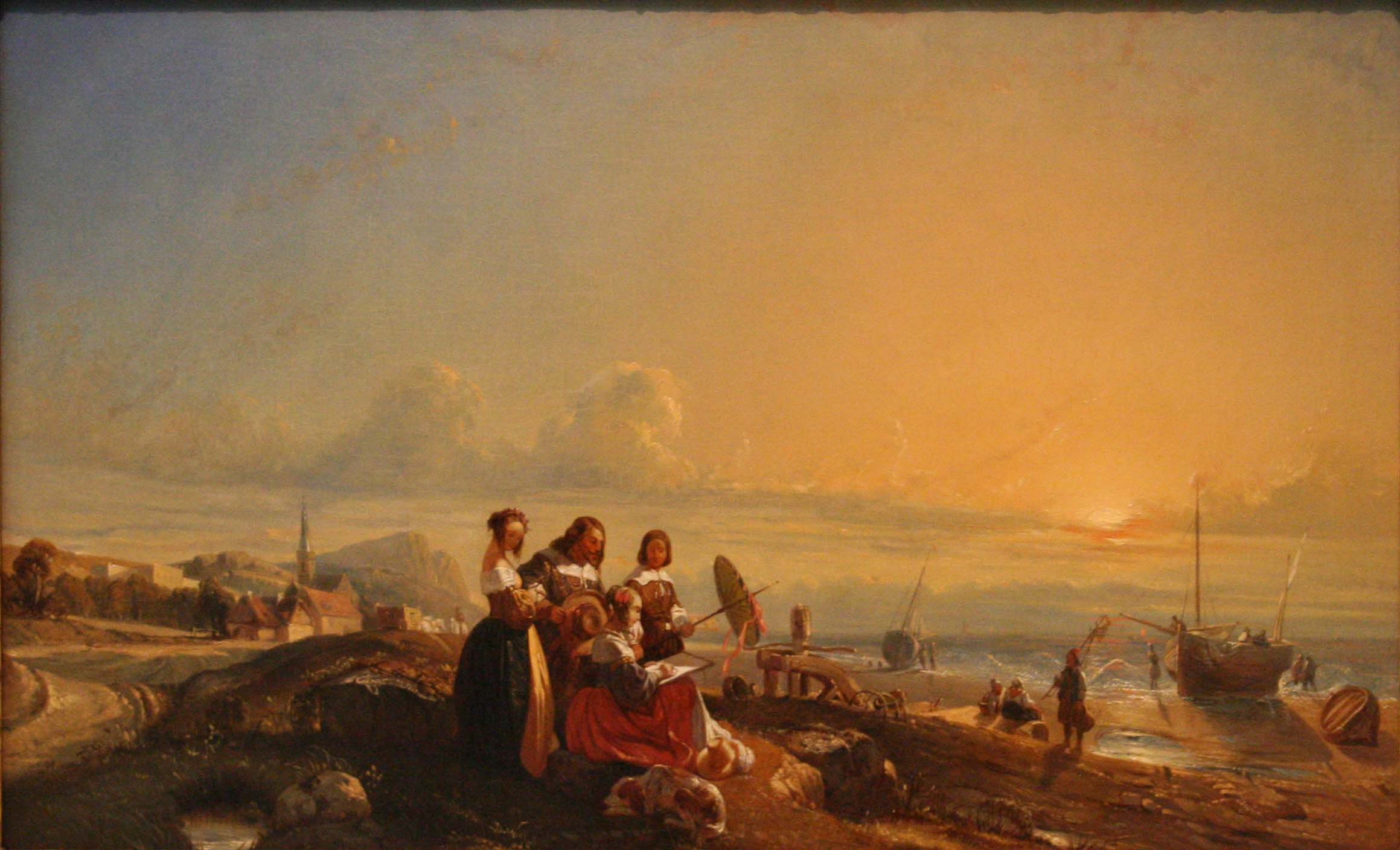
Coast Scene with Figures, 1831

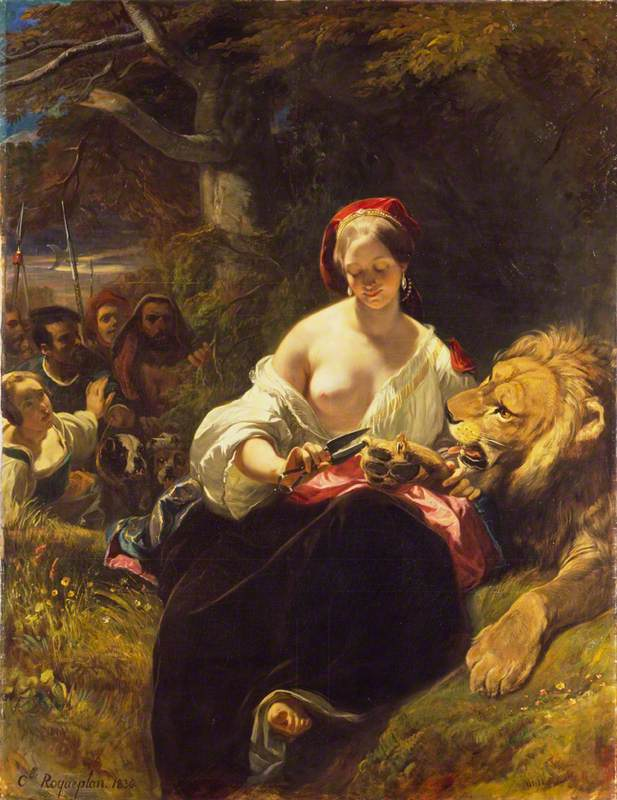
The Lion in Love (1836). Wallace Collection, London

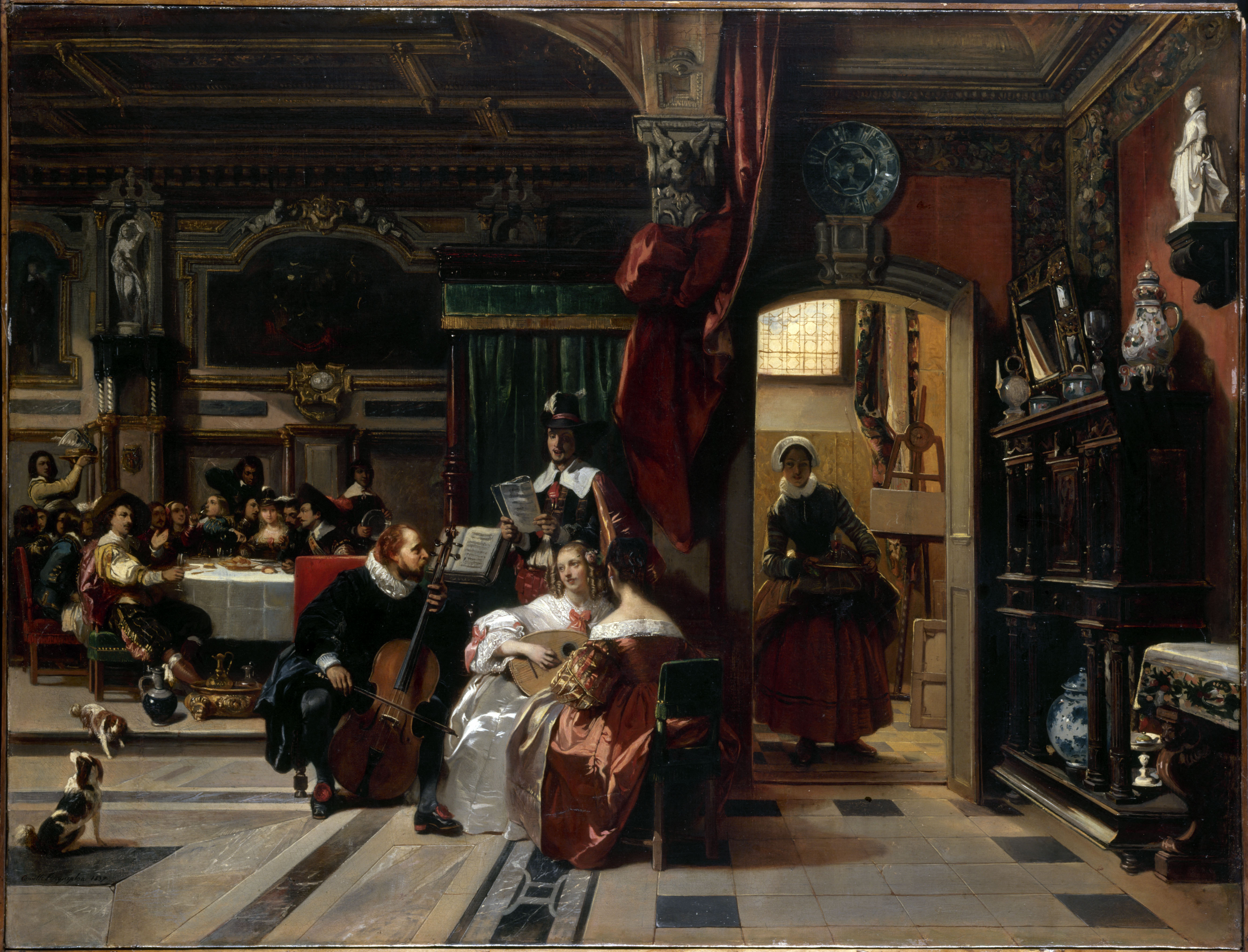
Van Dyck in London, 1837

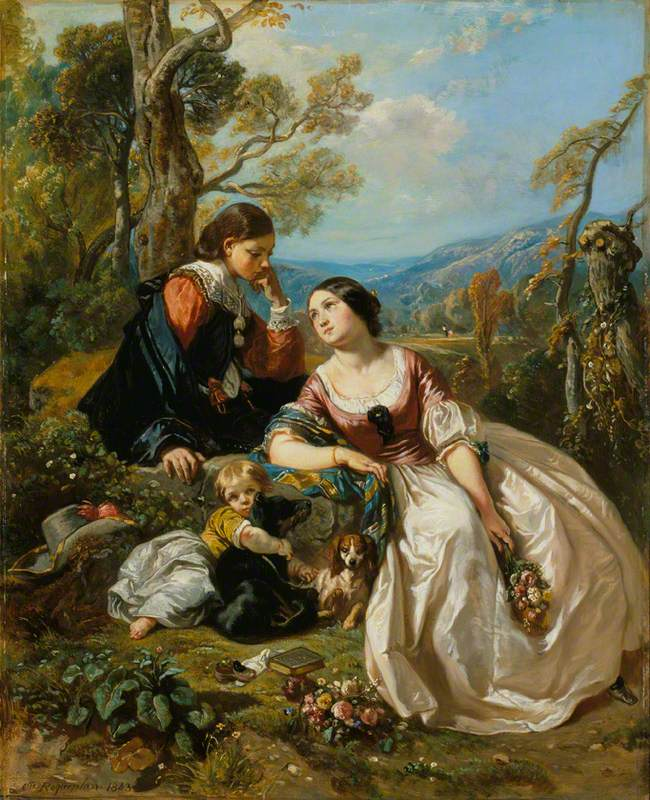
A Sentimental Conversation, 1843

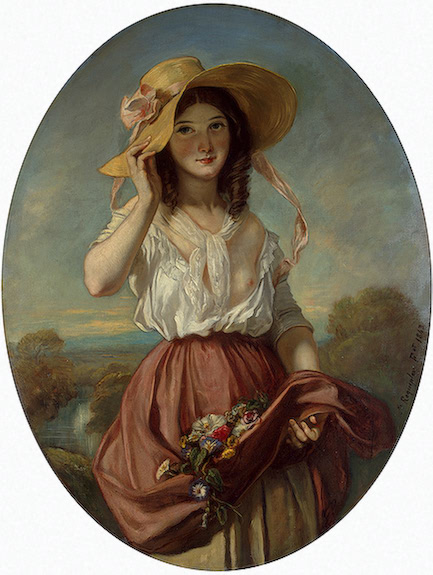
Girl with Flowers (1843). Hermitage Museum, St. Petersburg

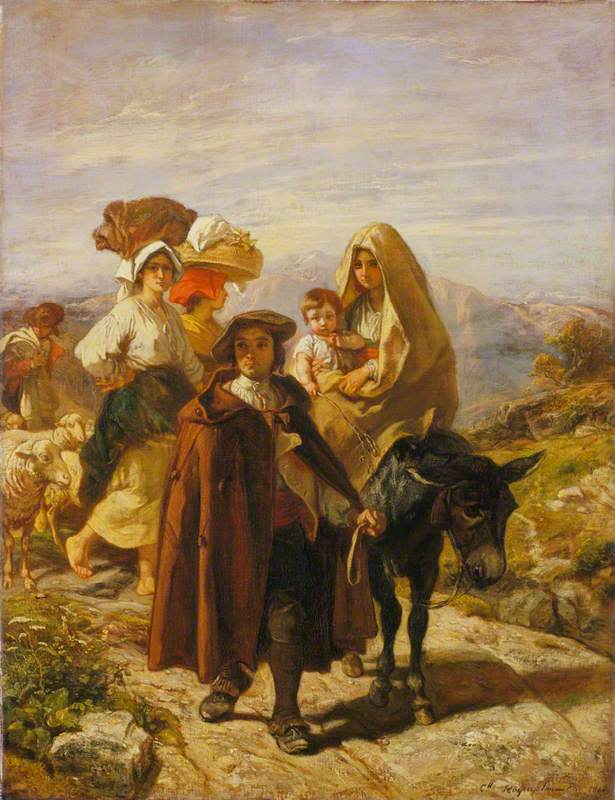
Peasants of Béarn, 1846

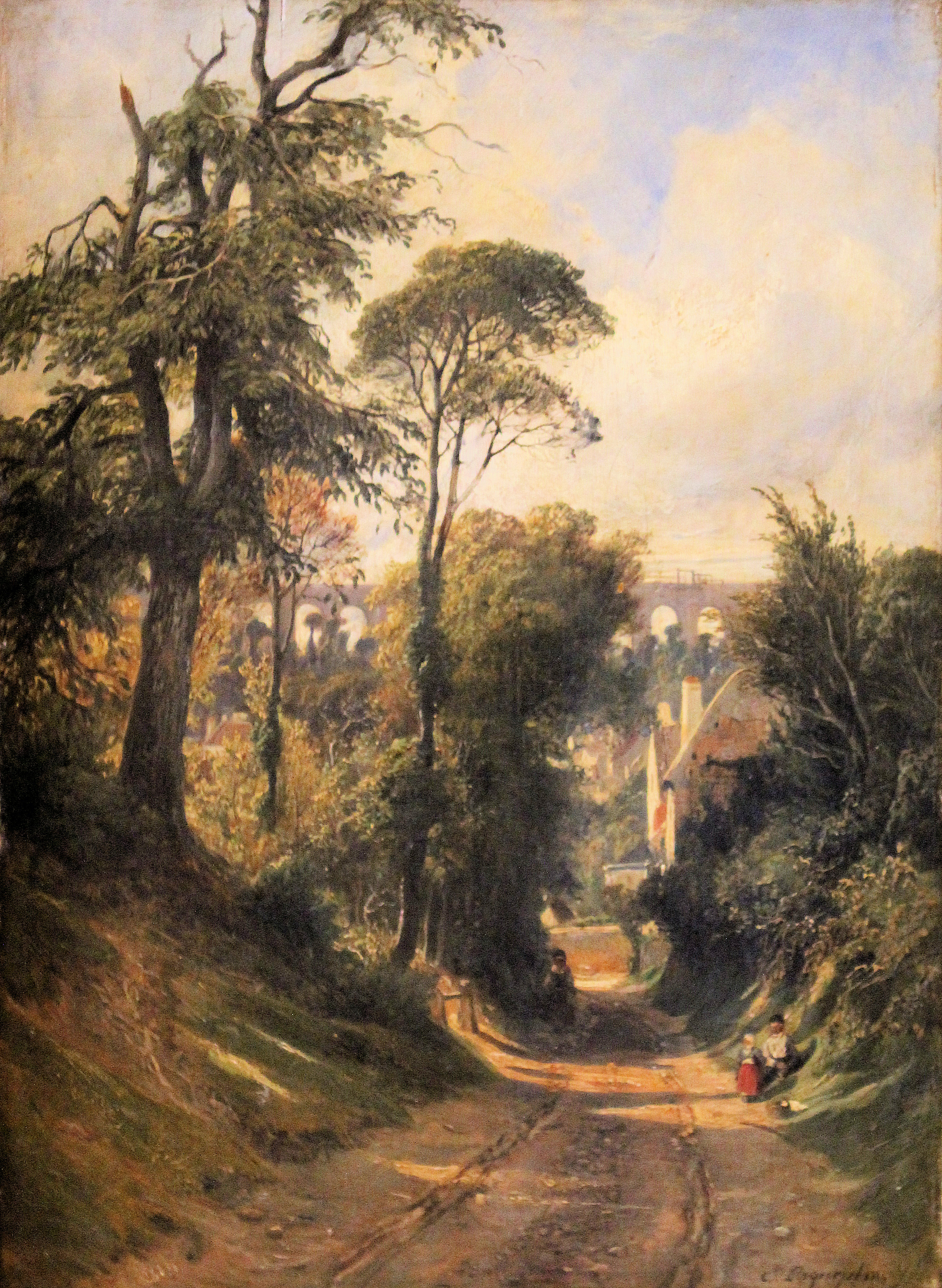
Vue du Val-Fleury (between 1825 and 1848, Musée Condé, Chantilly

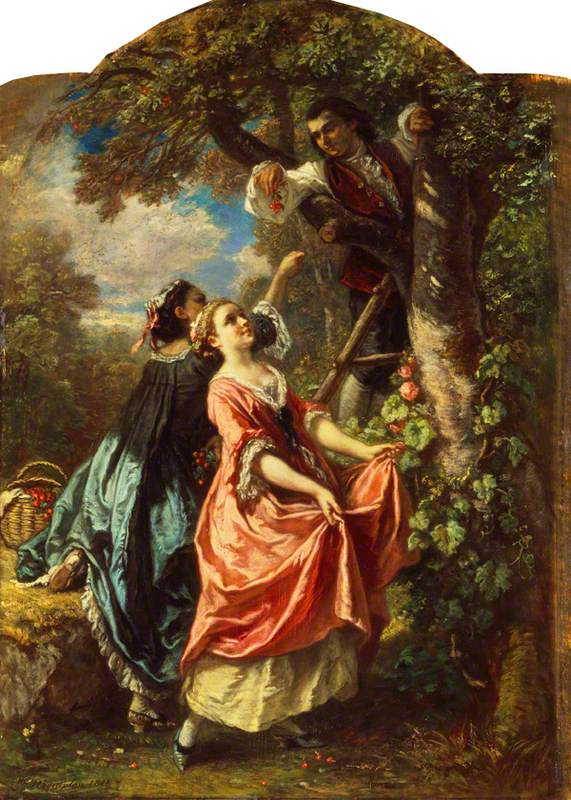
Rousseau and Mademoiselle Galley Gathering Cherries, 1851
