= Chao-Kang =

1834 ballet-pantomime

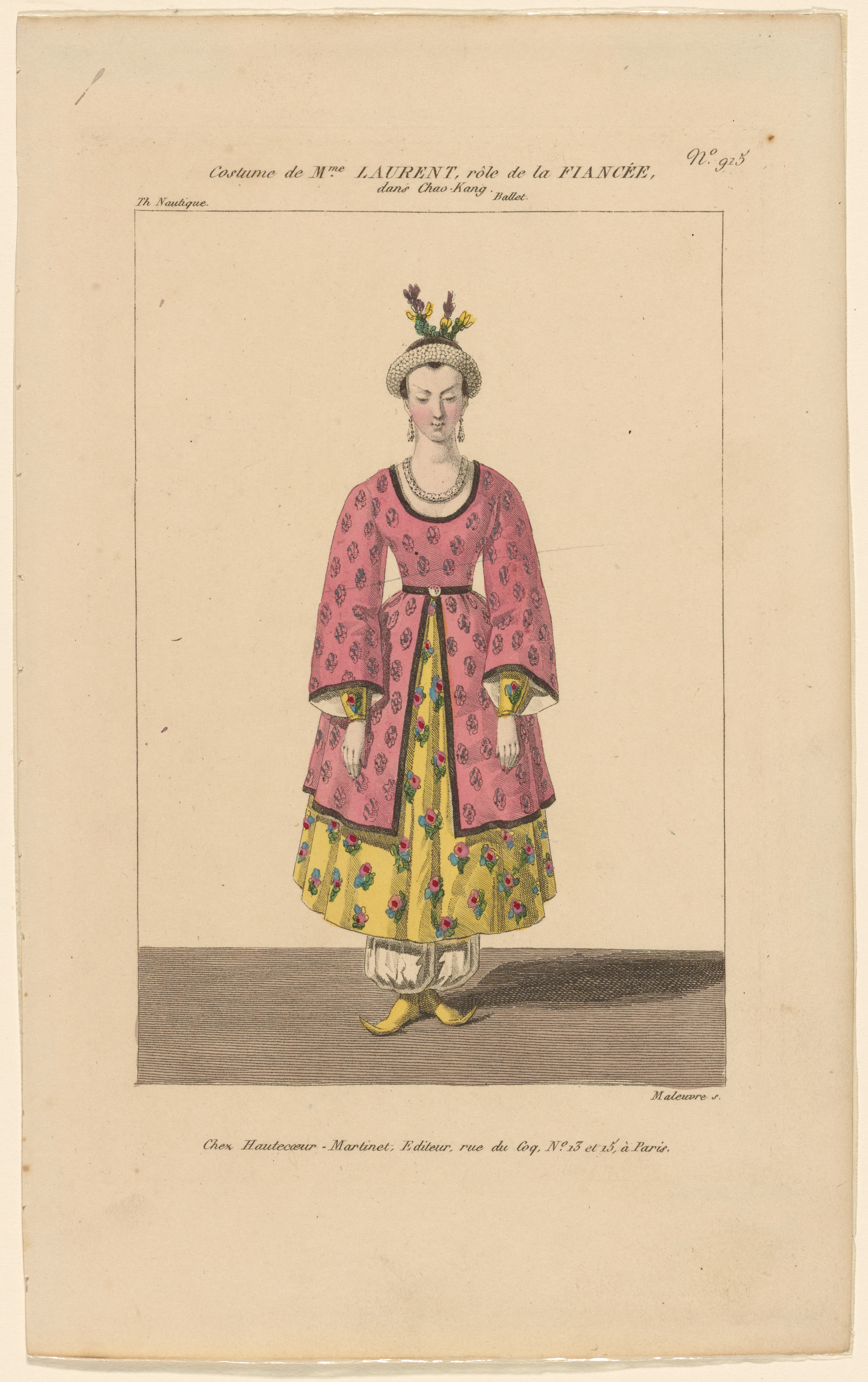
- Native title: Chao-Kang
- Choreographer: Louis Henry
- Music: Luigi Carlini
- Premiere: 16 October 1834
- Genre: Pantomime
- Type: Ballet

Chao-Kang is a French ballet-pantomime created in 1834 and performed in Paris during the Romantic period.

== Background ==
Chao-Kang was directed by French choreographer Louis Henry with music arranged by Italian composer Luigi Carlini. Henry authored the work and developed the choreography. The ballet, presented in three acts, was in the pantomime genre and concluded with an epilogue by Louis Henry. Henry appears to have undertaken a detailed study of the customs and ways of life among China's people.

On 16 October 1834, Chao-Kang was premiered at the Théâtre Nautique, with Louis Henry in the title role and Madame Laurent as Chao-Kang's fiancée. The cast also featured Louis-François Gosselin as Han-Tsou and Télémaque, a dancer, in the role of a young Mandarin. The set and costume design drew inspiration from Ancient China and the Xia dynasty, recognized as China's first recorded dynasty.

== Roles ==
Role	Première cast, 16 October 1834 (Cast member: - )
Chao Kang	Louis Henry
Chao Kang's fiancee	Madame Laurent
Han-Tsou	Louis-François Gosselin
Young Mandarin	Télémaque
Old Mandarin	Laurent

== Synopsis ==
The ballet combines moral and political themes, celebrating the triumph of rightful rule over usurpation. Chao-Kang follows the story of Chao Kang, the son of the dethroned Tai Kang of the Yu dynasty. The antagonist is a wealthy Chinese lord who, despite controlling vast provinces and treasures, desires the crown. Lacking the bravery to win it in battle, he seizes it deceitfully, forcing the emperor into exile. After his mother, Empress Ming, escapes a massacre, she raises him in hiding as a shepherd boy. When his identity is discovered, the governor seeks to restore him to the throne. At 30, Chao Kang leads a successful conspiracy against the usurper, restoring him as the legitimate ruler. As punishment, the illegitimate ruler is publicly displayed in an iron cage to the people's satisfaction.
