= Coast Scene with Figures =

Painting by Camille Roqueplan

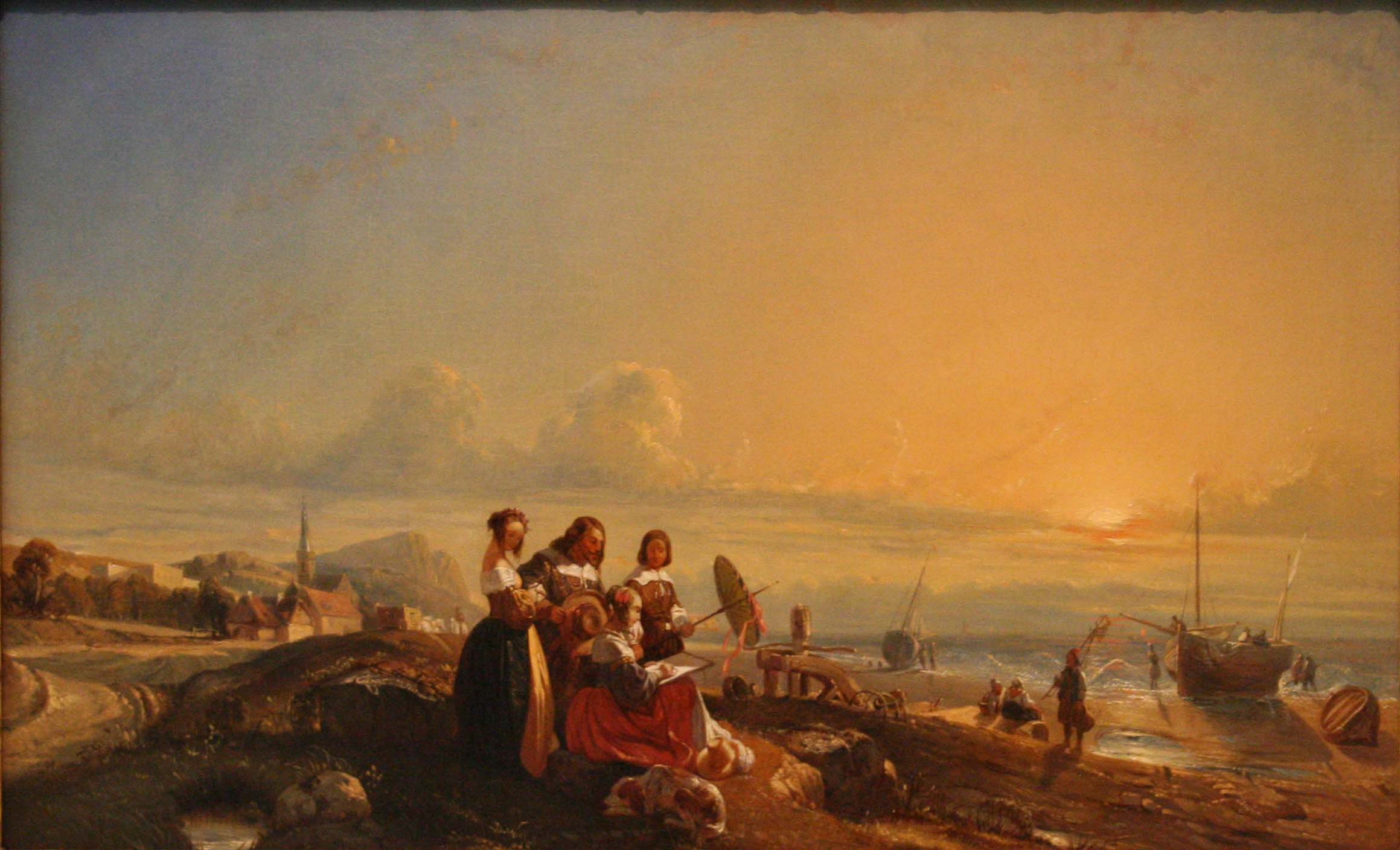
- Artist: Camille Roqueplan
- Year: 1831
- Type: Oil on canvas, landscape painting
- Dimensions: 38 cm × 65 cm (15 in × 26 in)
- Location: Musée Fabre; Montpellier

Coast Scene with Figures (French:Coup de vent et diligence) is an 1831 landscape painting by the French artist Camille Roqueplan. It features a view of the coastline of Northern France at sunset and combines element of genre painting with the focus on the group gathered around a woman who is painting a portrait of a shrimper. It combines female costumes of the present era with men dressed in the fashions of the reign of Louis XVIII two centuries before.

Roqueplan was a significant figure of the French Romantic movement which thrived in France following the end of the Napoleonic era. The painting was displayed at the Salon of 1831 at the Louvre in Paris, one of fourteen pictures that Roqueplan submitted that year. The painting has been in the collection of the Musée Fabre in Montpellier since 1896.

== Bibliography ==
- Noon, Patrick & Bann, Stephen. Constable to Delacroix: British Art and the French Romantics. Tate, 2003.
