= Salvatore Taglioni =

Italian dancer and choreographer (1790–1868)

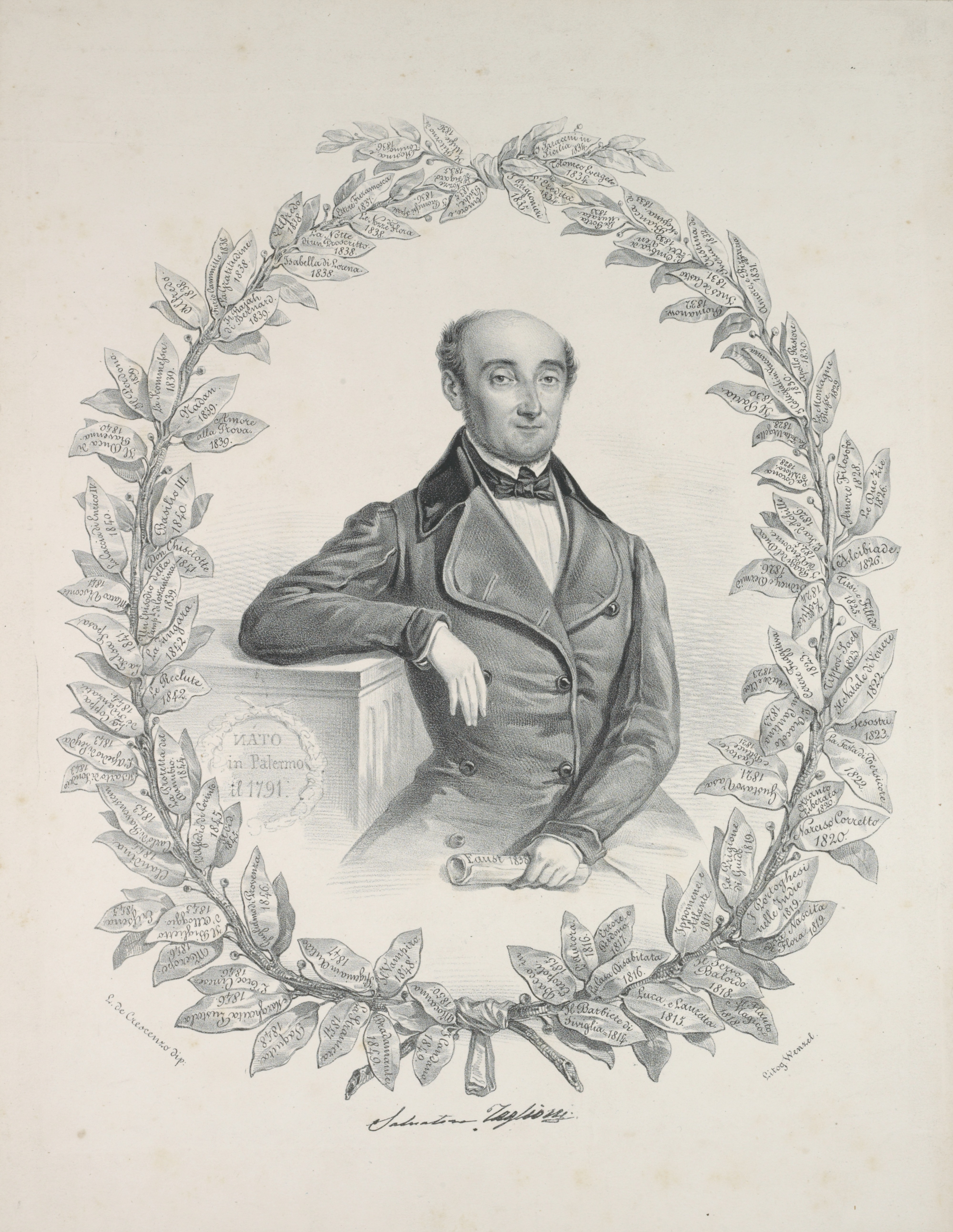
- Born: Salvatore Taglioni; 1790; Palermo, Kingdom of Sicily
- Died: 5 October 1868 (aged 77–78); Naples, Kingdom of Italy
- Occupations: Dancer; Choreographer

Salvatore Taglioni (1790 – 5 October 1868) was an Italian dancer and choreographer who danced and produced ballets in the 19th century.

== Early life ==
Salvatore Taglioni was born in Palermo, Sicily, in 1790.

He was the younger brother of Filippo Taglioni and an uncle of ballet dancer Marie Taglioni. He married Adélaïde Péraud, who was also a dancer. He welcomed his son, Ferdinando Taglioni, in Naples on 14 September 1810. His daughter, Louisa Taglioni, was born in 1823 from his marriage to Adélaïde.

== Entertainment life ==
He studied in Paris with Jean-François Coulon, making his debut at the Opéra de Paris. Starting around 1806, he performed in Lyon and Bordeaux, remaining in France until he received a call to become the principal dancer at Teatro San Carlo in Naples, Italy. He succeeded Armand Vestris. With French choreographer Louis Henry, he established the Royal School of Ballet (Italian: Scuola Reale di Balllo) in Naples in 1812, attached to the opera house of Teatro San Carlo. He served as ballet master and staged ballets at the Teatro San Carlo from 1814 to the late 1850s. He worked as a guest choreographer in Milan, Turin, and Florence, often including himself and his wife, Adélaide Perraud, in his ballet productions.

Salvatore Taglioni's Castore e Polluce with music by Paolo Brambilla was premiered at La Scala in May 1820. In 1822, Taglioni choreographed a work titled La Festa Di Tersicore with music composed by Italian composer Luigi Carlini. In 1825, he was a principal dancer at La Scala's premiere of I Baccanali di Roma by Gaetano Rossi.

Taglioni staged the five-act ballet Sesostri, composed by Luigi Carlini, on 12 January 1823 at Teatro San Carlo, celebrating the birthday of Ferdinand I.

On August 19, 1830, he premiered Il Paria ballo at Teatro San Carlo. In 1831, he received an invitation from the Berlin court to compose and establish ballet schools. Ferdinand II, wanting to keep him in Naples due to the success of Ines de Castro, granted him the title of Ballet Composer of the Royal Theatres for life, along with a royal stipend in 1832.

With its theme taken from Alessandro Manzoni's The Betrothed, Taglioni's ballet I promessi sposi achieved 56 performances in the 1836–37 season. He developed an adaptation of Faust in 1838 for the Teatro San Carlo.

As a composer of ballets, he produced over two hundred works.

== Death ==
Salvatore Taglioni died in Naples, Italy, on 5 October 1868.
