= L'île des pirates =

1835 ballet-pantomime

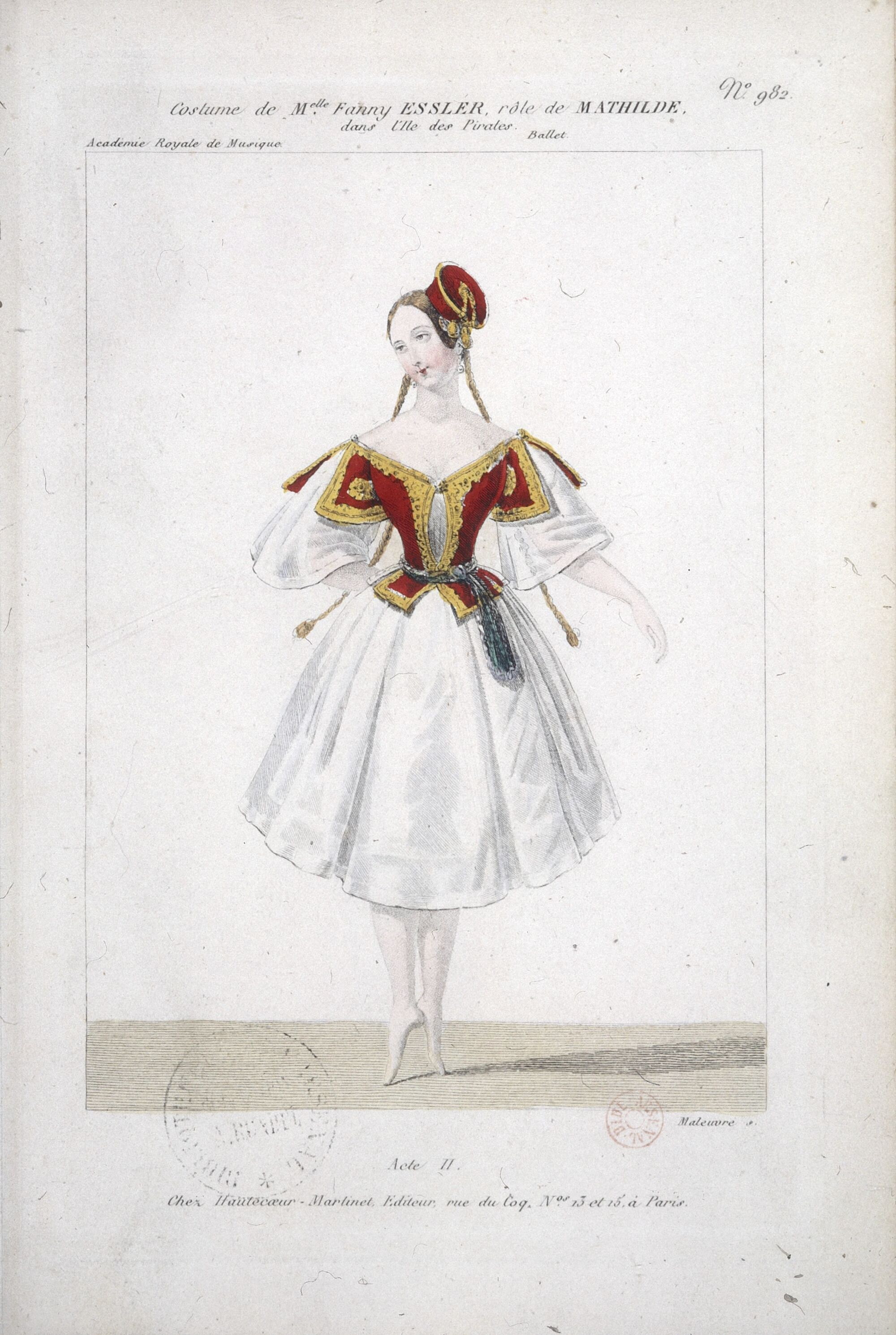
- L'île des pirates costume of Miss Fanny Elssler in the role of Mathilde
- Native title: L'île des pirates
- Choreographer: Louis Henry
- Music: Casimir Gide; Luigi Carlini; Gioachino Rossini; Ludwig van Beethoven
- Libretto: Adolphe Nourrit
- Premiere: 12 August 1835
- Genre: Pantomime
- Type: Ballet

L'île des pirates (English: The Island of Pirates) is a French ballet-pantomime created in 1835 and performed during the Romantic period.

== Background ==
The ballet L'île des pirates was presented in four acts by Louis Henry with music composed by Casimir Gide, Luigi Carlini, Gioachino Rossini, and Ludwig van Beethoven. The first act and the pas de deux in Act III were composed by Luigi Carlini, while Casimir Gide provided the music for the last three acts, supplemented by two passages from Gioachino Rossini and a sonata by Ludwig van Beethoven. The libretto came from Adolphe Nourrit, and Louis Henry developed the choreography. The production took between six and eight months to complete.

Premiering on 12 August 1835, at the Paris Opera, Fanny Elssler and her sister Thérèse filled the two main roles, with Fanny as "Mathilde". Louis-Stanislas Montjoie played the role of the pirate. The costumes were designed by Robert-Fleury. The sets for L’île des pirates were designed by several artists, each responsible for specific acts. Charles Séchan (Acts I and II), Léon Feuchère (Acts I and II), Jules Diéterle (Acts I and II), and Édouard Desplechin (Acts I and II) collaborated on the earlier acts, while René Philastre and Charles Cambon designed sets for Acts III and V. The scenes included: Act I – the gardens of a coastal villa with music by M. Carlini; Act II – aboard the interior of a ship high at sea with music by M. Gide; Act III – the Garden of Women on the Island of Pirates; and Act IV – the tent of the Pirate Chief. The second performance of the ballet was an even greater success than the first.

The role portrayed by Fanny Elssler was later taken over at the Paris Opera by Madame Duvernay and Pauline Leroux.

== Synopsis ==
The plot of L'île des pirates involves a young man in love with Mathilde played by Mlle Elssler, who is the fiancée of a pirate. Amid a backdrop of continual disguises, comings and goings, and romantic glances, the young man ultimately seeks to win her affection. With the aid of an entire fleet, he attempts to besiege the pirate's floating citadel and reclaim his beloved from the pirate.

== Gallery ==
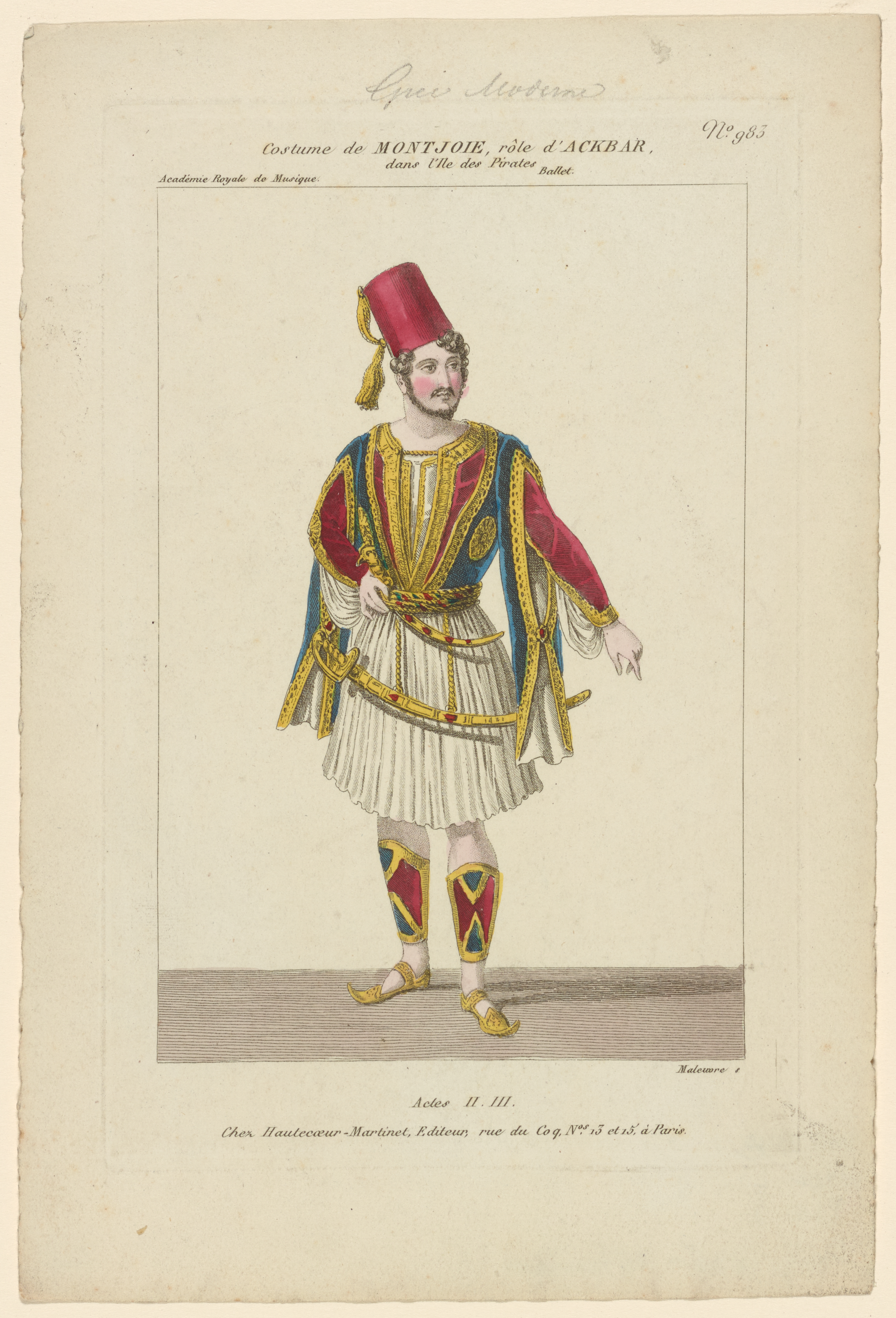
Costume of Montjoie, role of Ackbar, in L'île des pirates, Opéra de Paris, Acts II and III
