= Marie-Alexandre Alophe =

French photographer and lithographer (1812–1883)

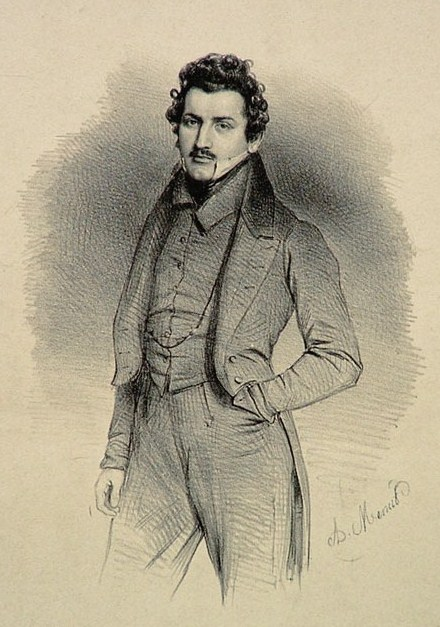
Self portrait, 1830

Marie-Alexandre Alophe (1812–1883) was a French photographer, painter and lithographer. He received his artistic training from Camille Roqueplan and Paul Delaroche.

Adolphe Marie Alexandre Menut was born on June 7, 1811, in Paris.

He trained in the studios of painters Camille Roqueplan and Paul Delaroche at the École des Beaux-Arts in Paris. His lithographs are characterized by a gentle sensuality, which made him well accepted by contemporary audiences. As a photographer, he is best known for his genre scenes.

Trained in photography by Gustave Le Gray, he took over his studio on Boulevard des Capucines after Le Gray's permanent departure for the East in 1860, unlawfully appropriating his negatives and employing the staff that Le Gray had trained.He sought to capitalize on Le Gray's reputation, but was unable to make the business prosperous. After the war of 1870, it passed successively into the hands of Fontaine and Van Bosch.

Marie-Alexandre Alophe died on August 4, 1883, in Mehun-sur-Yèvre (Cher).
