= Louis Henry (choreographer) =

French choreographer (1784-1836)

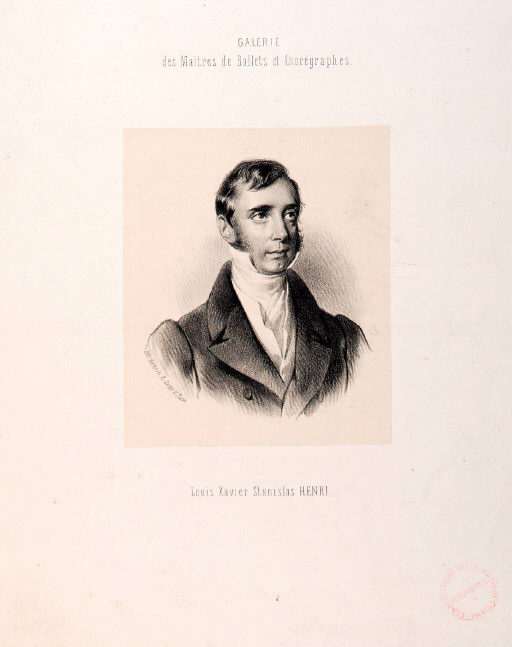
- Born: Louis Henry; 5 March 1784; Versailles, Yvelines, France
- Died: 4 November 1836 (aged 52); Milan, Italy
- Occupations: Dancer; Choreographer

Louis Henry (5 March 1784 – 4 November 1836) was a French dancer and choreographer.

== Early life ==
Louis Xavier Stansislas Henri Bonnachon was born in Versailles, Yvelines, France on 5 March 1784.

== Entertainment life ==
Louis Henry studied at the Paris Opera School with Deshayes, Gardel, and Coulon. He started his career at the Opéra de Paris in 1803, later moving to the Théâtre de la Porte Saint-Martin as its ballet master. After leaving France, Italy was where Henry spent most of his professional life during the Romantic period. He performed mainly in Italian theaters, such as Teatro San Carlo and Teatro del Fondo in Naples, and La Scala in Milan. In 1812, alongside Italian choreographer Salvatore Taglioni, Henry launched the Royal School of Ballet (Italian: Scuola Reale di Balllo) in Naples, connected to Teatro San Carlo.

On 28 May 1828, he premiered one of the earliest works titled La Sylphide at Milan's La Scala with music composed by Italian composer Luigi Carlini.

First staged at La Scala in Milan in 1829, Henry's ballet La festa da ballo in maschera inspired accusations against Filippo Taglioni, who allegedly used its choreography for the masked ball in Daniel Auber's 1833 opera Gustave III at the Opéra de Paris. Both Henry's ballet and Auber's opera center on the 1792 assassination attempt of Gustav III, king of Sweden.

Louis Henry staged various pantomime ballets including his 1834 ballet Chao-Kang (music by Luigi Carlini) which premiered at the Théâtre Nautique. Following this, he directed L'île des pirates, premiering on 12 August 1835 at the Opéra de Paris.

== Death ==
Louis Henry died in Milan, Italy on 4 November 1836.
