= Constance Jawureck =

French opera singer

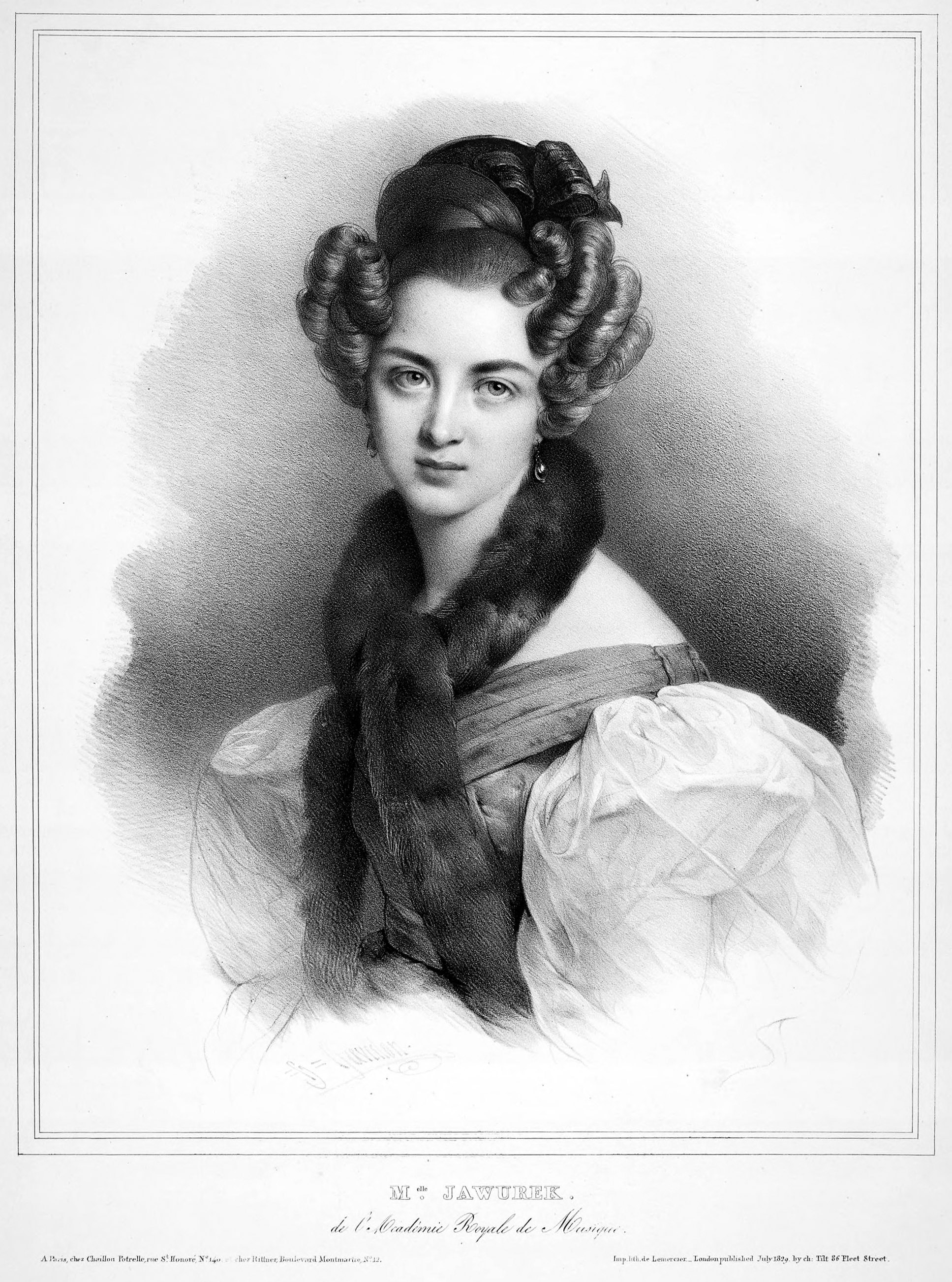
Constance Jawureck portrayed in 1829

Constance Jawureck (also Jawurek or Javoureck) (1803–1858) was a French mezzo-soprano opera singer.

The daughter of a German musician, she was born in Paris and entered the Paris Conservatory at the age of 14 where she studied singing under Plantade and Garat and acting under Baptiste. She made her stage debut to considerable success in 1822 as Zarine in the posthumous premiere of Isouard's Aladin ou La lampe merveilleuse. She continued to be cast in relatively small roles until her success in 1826 as Amazily in a revival of Gasparo Spontini's Fernand Cortez after which she became a leading mezzo-soprano at the Paris Opera. Amongst the roles she created there were in Inès in Auber's Vendôme en Espagne (1822), Isolier in Rossini's Le comte Ory (1828), Jeanette in Auber's Le philtre (1831) and Fleur de Lys in Bertin's La Esmeralda (1836). She remained at the Paris Opera until 1837 and then became a leading singer in Brussels where she sang the title role in Donizetti's Lucie de Lammermoor for its first performance at the Théâtre Royal de la Monnaie (1839). Jawureck was known for her beauty as well as her voice, and according to Hector Berlioz's biographer, David Cairns, both Berlioz and his friend, the poet Thomas Gounet, were hopelessly in love with her, a sentiment which she did not reciprocate.

== Notes and references ==
Sources

- Burat de Gurgy, Edmond (1837). "Mlle. Jawureck", Biographie des acteurs de Paris. Edouard Proux (in French)
- Cairns, David (2003). Berlioz: Volume One: The Making of an Artist, 1803–1832. University of California Press. ISBN 0-520-24056-1
- Casaglia, Gherardo (2005)."Performances listed as 'Jawureck'". L'Almanacco di Gherardo Casaglia (in Italian).; Casaglia, Gherardo (2005)."Performances listed as 'Jawoureck'". L'Almanacco di Gherardo Casaglia (in Italian).
- Weinstock, Herbert (1968). Rossini: A Biography, Oxford University Press
