= Jacques Auguste Regnier =

French painter (1787–1860)

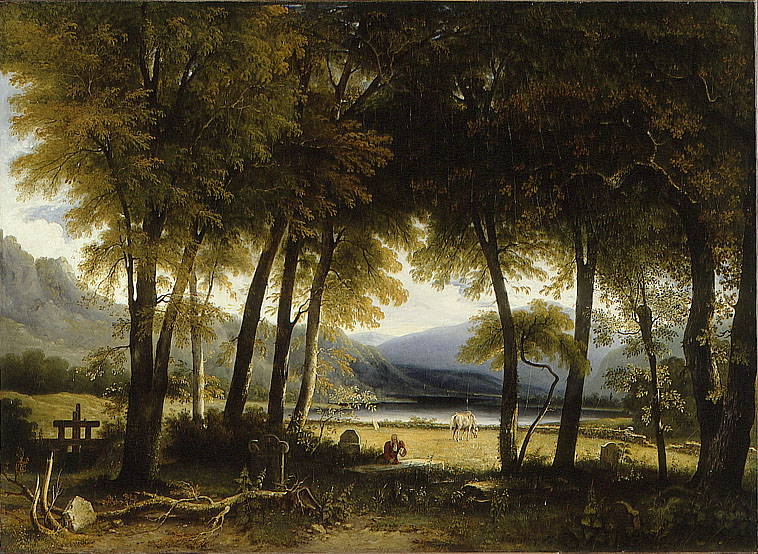
Old Mortality

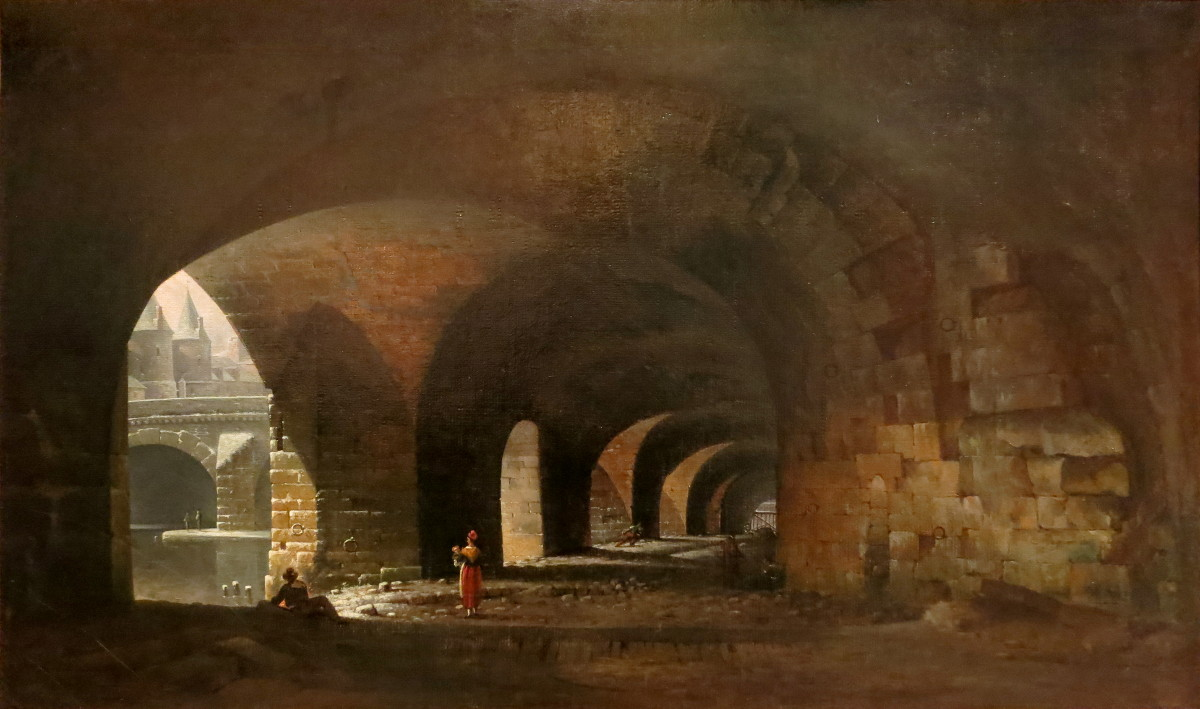
The Vault of the Quai de Gesvres

Jacques Auguste Regnier, sometimes given as Auguste Jacques (26 August 1787, Paris – 2 June 1860, Paris) was a French artist who painted in the Romantic style. He also helped introduce the Troubadour style and was heavily influenced by English literature.

== Biography ==
He was trained at the school of Pierre-Henri de Valenciennes, where he was a student of Jean-Victor Bertin, who influenced him to become a painter of landscapes and historical scenes. He began exhibiting at the Salon in 1812 and travelled widely throughout France; visiting Auvergne, Dauphiné, Normandy and Picardy. Following these travels, he produced rural scenes that attracted the attention of the Duchess of Berry and Louis-Philippe I.

In addition to these scenes, he produced works illustrating the history of France; notably a depiction of Joan of Arc, swearing her devotion to the salvation of France, which is now at the Palais de Fontainebleau, and works inspired by literature; Walter Scott in particular. His "Old Mortality" is on display at the Louvre.

He was, in fact, generally an enthusiast for the Anglomania that developed in France in the 1830s; becoming a member of the circle that surrounded Richard Parkes Bonington, and was one of the first French artists to become interested in the works of John Constable. His friend, Eugène Delacroix, subsequently became a great admirer of Constable after Regnier presented him with some lithographs from his collection.

He was also influenced by the young Victor Hugo, and was inspired to pursue his romantic vision of Old Paris. In 1825, with the help of his student, Jean-Jacques Champin, he began creating an illustrated book on the subject, which would be called Vues pittoresques des principaux châteaux et des maisons de plaisance des environs de Paris et des départements lithographié par Auguste Regnier. This was followed by La Seine et ses abords (1836), Habitations des personnages les plus célèbres de France depuis 1790 jusqu'à nos jours and Promenade dans les rues de Paris, Dessins d’Auguste Regnier, Lithographiés Jean Jacques Champin. Notices de Charles Nodier (1838). As a result, he was named a Chevalier in the Legion of Honor in 1837 and received commissions from King Louis-Philippe to do illustrations of the Château de Bizy and the Château de Versailles.

Despite this success with the aristocracy, he fell victim to the increasing fashion for Realism and his career effectively came to an end together with the July Monarchy in 1848.
