= Clément Boulanger =

French painter (1805–1842)

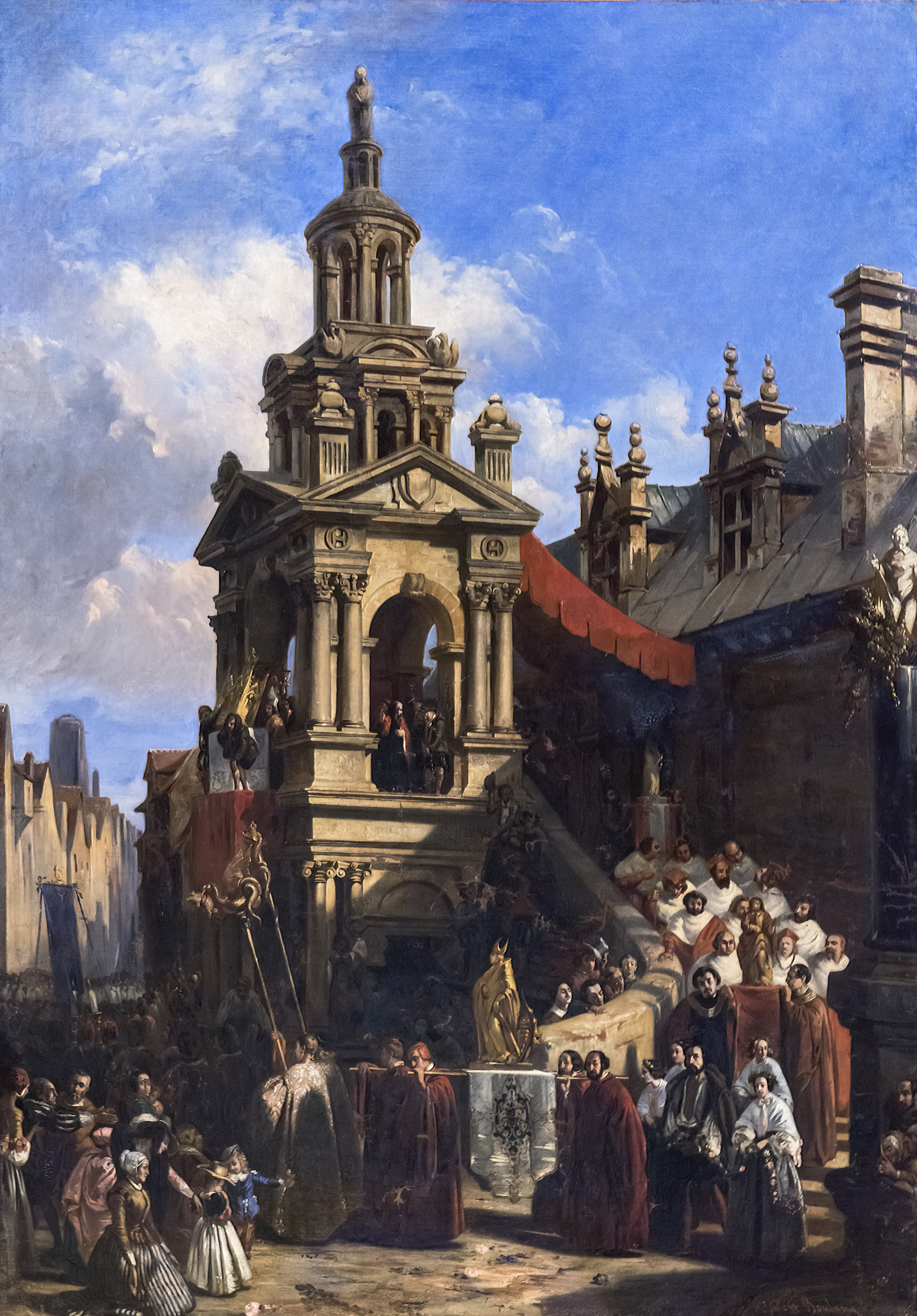
The Procession of the Gargoyle Musée des Augustins

Clément Boulanger, who was born at Paris in 1805, studied under Ingres, and died in 1842 at Magnesia ad Maeandrum in Asia Minor (According to the memorial inscription at St. Polycarp church in Smyrna). His pictures are chiefly historical, but he also painted landscapes and portraits. The following are some of the principal:

- Bordeaux. Museum.

Portrait of Cardinal Donnet, Archbishop of Bordeaux. 1839.
The Vintage of Médoc.

- Lille. Museum. Procession of the Corpus Domini (signed and dated ROMAE 1830).
- Nantes. Museum. Procession of the 'Ardents.' 1842.
- Toulouse. Museum. Procession of the 'Gargouille' at Rouen. 1837.
- Versailles. Gallery. Entry of the French Army into Moutiers.

He was the first husband of the painter Marie-Élisabeth Blavot.
