= Charles Plantade =

Charles Plantade may refer to:

- Charles-Henri Plantade (1764–1839), French composer
- Charles-François Plantade (1787–1870), French composer, son of Charles-Henri
