= Dabadie =

Dabadie is a surname. Notable people with the surname include:

- Henri-Bernard Dabadie, French baritone
- Jean-Loup Dabadie, French academician
