= Zulmé Dabadie =

French opera singer (1795–1877)

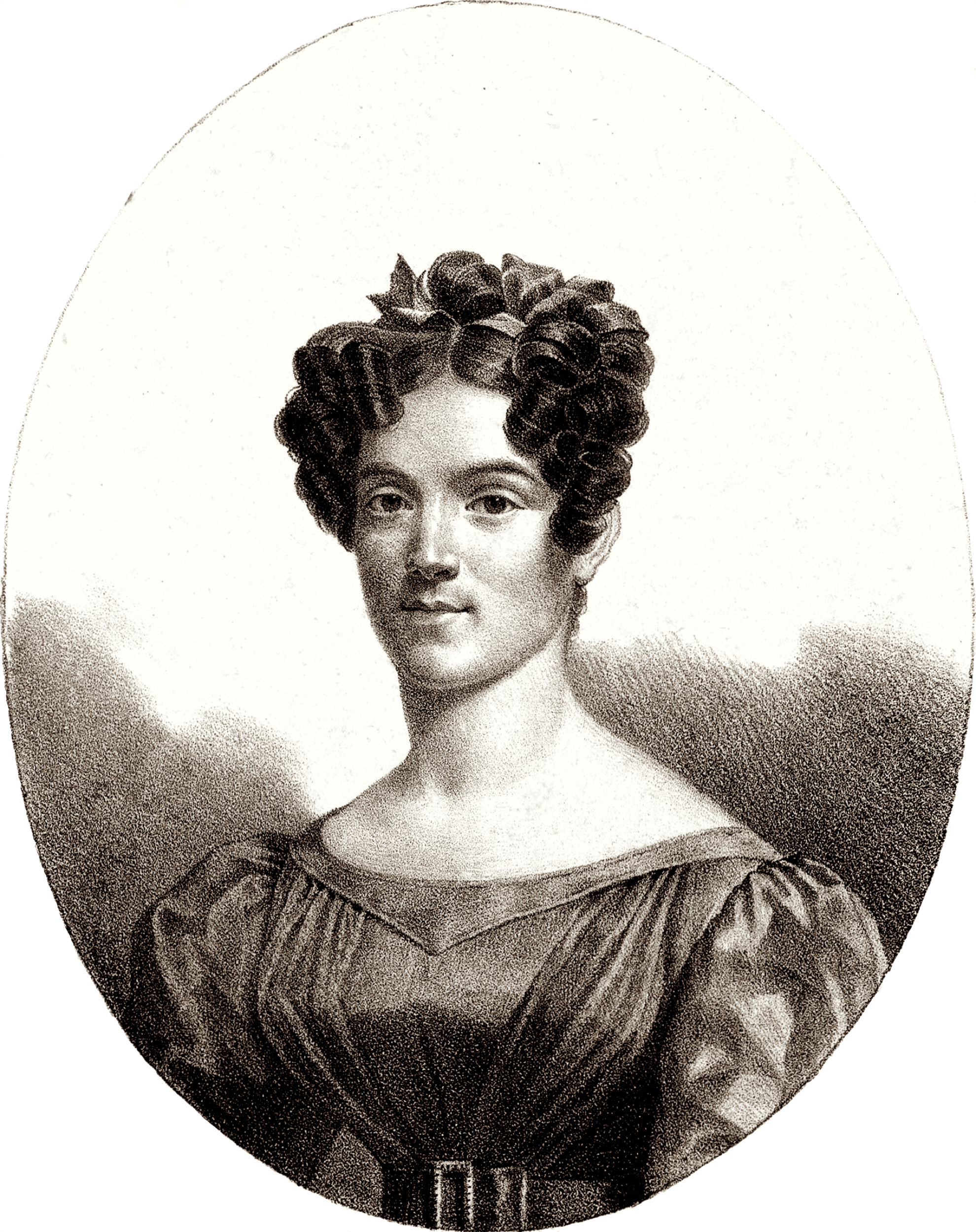
- Born: Zulmée Leroux; 15 October 1795; Boulogne-sur-Mer, France
- Died: 21 November 1877 (aged 82); Paris, France
- Occupation: Opera singer
- Spouse: Henri-Bernard Dabadie
- Family: Clara Lavry (sister)

Signature
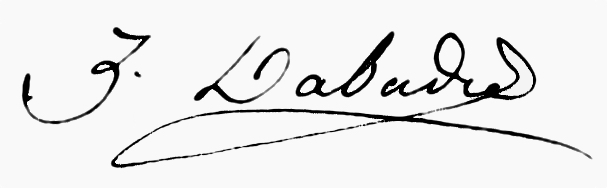

Zulmé Dabadie (born Zulmée Leroux, 15 October 1795 – 21 November 1877) (Note: A birth date of 15 October 1795 (Boulogne-sur-Mer) is consistent with her reported ages of 70 at the time of the marriage of her daughter Claire on 13 June 1866 and 82 at her death on 21 November 1877. Her name on her birth record is Zulmée Leroux, on the reconstituted record of her marriage it is given as Zulmée Leroux, and on the marriage record of her daughter, she signs her name Zulmée Leroux (see Commons:File:Signature of Zulmée Leroux 1866-06-13.jpg). Her first name is simply Zulmé in her death record and both death notices cited here. As early as 1842, a source gives her maiden name as Louise-Zulmé Leroux and her birth year as 1804. In 1861, François-Joseph Fétis gives the name "Dabadie (Mme. Louise-Zulmé)" and states she was born in Paris on 20 March 1804. These claims may be due to confusion with another singer, Louise-Zulmé Leroux (born 22 March 1804, Paris; died 29 April 1874, London) [Wikidata]. In 1900, Constant Pierre, historian of the Paris Conservatoire, has an entry "Le Roux (Louise-Zulmé), née 20 mars 1804 (Pas-de-Calais)". Subsequent sources cited here give Zulmé Dabadie's birth year as 1804, include the given name Louise and her birth place as Boulogne-sur-Mer, while Jean-Louis Tamvaco says she was born on 15 October 1797 in Boulogne-sur-Mer (but also gives her birth name as Louise Zulmé Leroux). Boulogne-sur-Mer is located in Pas-de-Calais. None of these authors provide citations.) was a French opera singer active at the Paris Opéra, where she sang both soprano and mezzo-soprano roles. Among the roles she created were Jemmy in Rossini's William Tell and Sinaïde in his Moïse et Pharaon. Born in Boulogne-sur-Mer and trained at the Conservatoire de Paris, she made her stage debut at the Paris Opéra in 1821 and remained with that company until her retirement from the stage in 1835. After her retirement she taught singing in Paris, where she died at the age of 82. She was married to the French baritone Henri-Bernard Dabadie.

== Early life and training ==
She was born Zulmée Leroux on 15 October 1795 in Boulogne-sur-Mer, where she began her music studies. Her father was Benoît Leroux, a musician, and her mother was Louise Pallasalle. Her younger sister, Clara Leroux (born 1806 in Boulogne-sur-Mer), also became a singer, who after her marriage was known as Mme Lavry and debuted at the Opéra as the Lady-in-waiting to Isabelle in the 1831 premiere of Meyerbeer's opera Robert le diable. (Note: According to Jean-Louis Tamvaco, she had another sister, Pauline Leroux (1809–1891), a dancer whose father was an army officer who had died in 1812 during the retreat from Moscow. That Pauline Leroux was Zulmé Dabadie's sister may be erroneous, since Pauline Leroux's father is said to have been Louis-Bénigne-Marie Leroux and mother, Marguerite-Suzanne (née Lecocq).)

Zulmé Leroux enrolled at the Conservatoire de Paris on 9 July 1814, made rapid progress in solfège and continued her studies in singing under Charles-Henri Plantade. She was awarded first prize in singing and declamation in 1819.

== Career at the Opéra ==
She made her stage debut under the name Zulmé Leroux at the Paris Opéra on 31 January 1821 as Antigone in Sacchini's Œdipe à Colone. On 23 March of that year she was offered a permanent position at the Opéra as a cover (remplacement) for the primadonnas Caroline Branchu and Caroline Grassari, singing their roles when they were unavailable. When Branchu retired, Dabadie was promoted to the first rank.

On 6 November 1821, she married one of the Opéra's leading baritones, Bernard Dabadie, and was billed as Mme Dabadie when she created the title role of Anton Reicha's Sapho on 16 December 1822. She and her husband often appeared together in the premieres of the same operas, such as Rossini's Moïse et Pharaon (26 March 1827) and William Tell (3 August 1829). The couple had several children, including a son Victor (1823–1853) and a daughter Claire (born 19 January 1837), who was also a musician prior to her marriage to the architect Edmond Guillaume on 13 June 1866.

Zulmé Dabadie's first big success in a major role at the Opéra came in August 1825 as Julia in Spontini's La vestale. In June of that year she had sung the role of The Spirit of France in Boieldieu's Pharamond. The opera was a failure at its premiere, which was attended by the recently crowned King Charles X, and only the final tableau with Dabadie was singled out for praise. She appeared on a cloud dressed in a gold breastplate and helmet and carrying a banner emblazoned with the fleur-de-lis. She then gestured to the back curtain, which parted to reveal a receding line of illustrious French kings ending with the Arc de Triomphe and the Tuileries Palace on the far horizon.

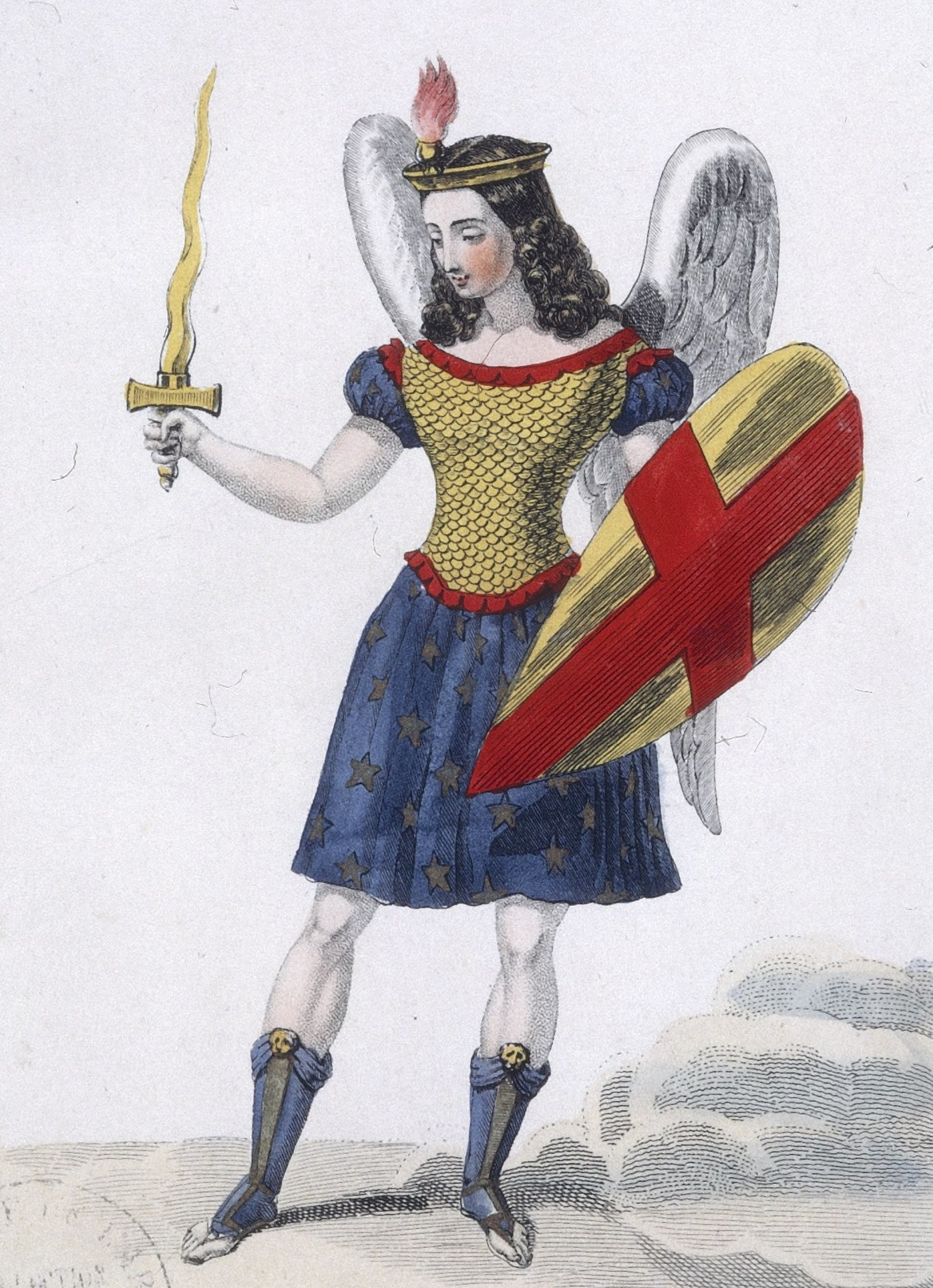
Dabadie as the angel Mizaël in La tentation, 1832

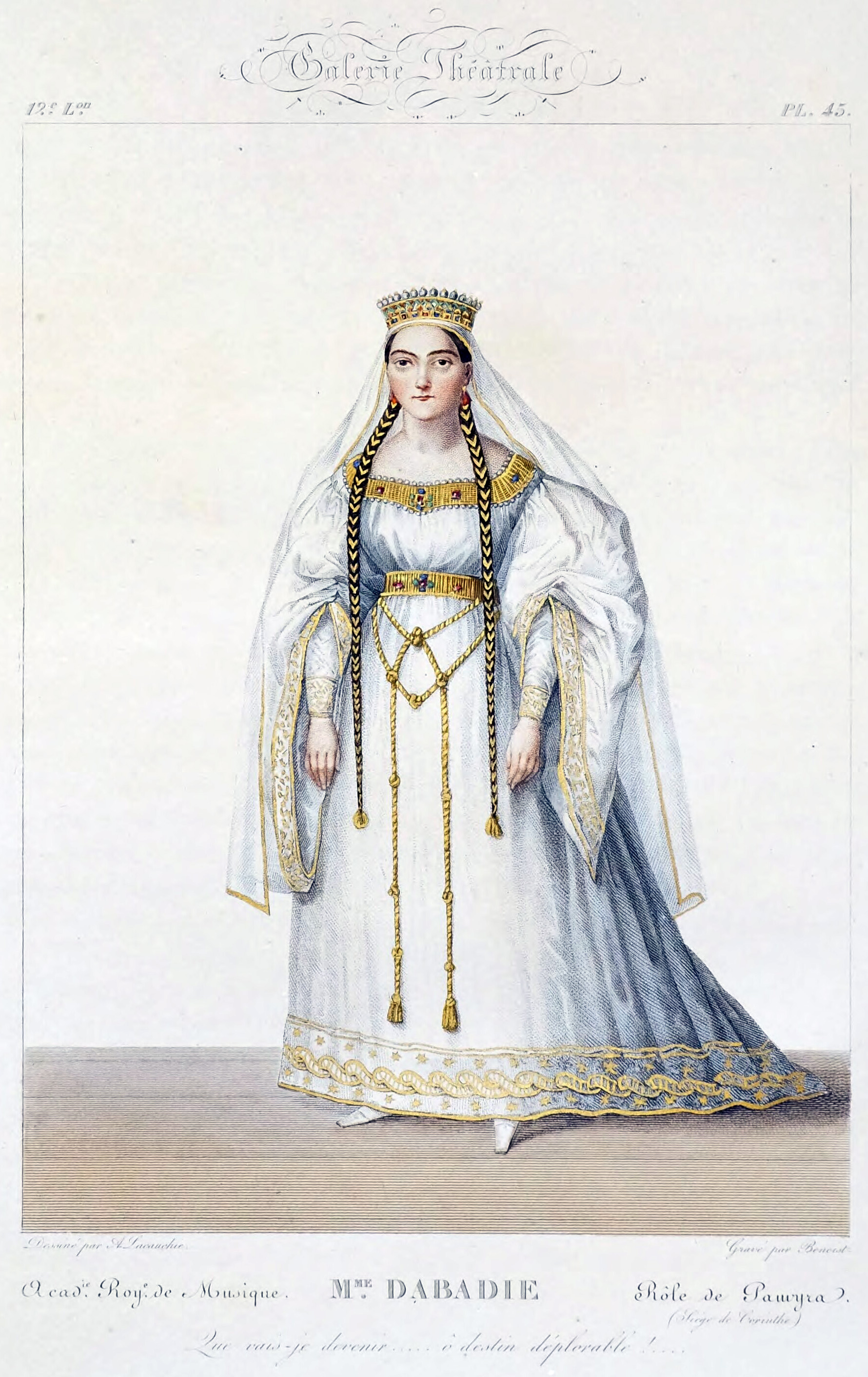
Dabadie as Pamyra in Le siège de Corinthe

Dabadie went on to create the roles of Sinaïde in Moïse et Pharaon (1827), Lady Macbeth in Chélard's Macbeth (1827), Jemmy in William Tell (1829), Mizaël in La tentation (1832), and Arvedson in Gustave III (1833). Her other leading roles at the Opéra included Eurydice in Orphée et Eurydice, Iphigénie in Iphigénie en Tauride, Pamyra in Le siège de Corinthe, Adèle in Le comte Ory, Amazily in Fernand Cortez, and Églantine in the first French performance of Euryanthe. Dabadie's voice was beautiful and well-schooled, with a purity of style and diction, but Laure Cinti-Damoreau somewhat eclipsed her fame when she joined the company in 1826. Several of the leading roles in Paris Opéra premieres were given to Cinti-Damoreau, with Dabadie either in secondary roles (as in Moïse et Pharaon and William Tell) or singing Cinti-Damoreau's roles in revival performances (such as Le siège de Corinthe and Le comte Ory).

== Other activities ==
From 1821 to 1830, Dabadie was also a principal singer in the Chapelle royale of Louis XVIII and later Charles X. She had been engaged by the Duc de La Châtre in 1821 after he heard her performance at Notre Dame Cathedral in a Te Deum marking the baptism of the Count of Chambord. In addition to her appearances at the Opéra and the Chapelle royale, Dabadie regularly sang in the concert series held by the Société des Concerts du Conservatoire and twice performed cantatas in the final round of the Prix de Rome composition competition. (Note: For the Prix de Rome, the competitors were all required to set the same text as a cantata. The competitors hired their own singers for the performances before the jury.) In 1827 she sang Jean-Baptiste Guiraud's version of La Mort d'Orphée, the first-prize winner. Berlioz hired her to sing his version of Hermine for the 1828 competition and was awarded the second prize. He hired her again in 1829 for La mort de Cléopâtre. She sang in the qualification round, but a last-minute rehearsal for the premiere of William Tell prevented her from singing it in the final round. Instead, she sent her sister Clara, who was still a student at the Paris Conservatory and was overwhelmed by the difficulty of the score. Berlioz failed to win either first or second prize.

== Retirement and later life ==
Dabadie and her husband retired from the stage in 1835, after which they both taught singing in Paris. Writing in 1861, François-Joseph Fétis attributed her relatively early retirement to a serious deterioration of her voice and claimed that this early vocal decline was due to the "deplorable" training system at the Paris Conservatory during the years she studied there. This assessment was strongly disputed by Jacques-Léopold Heugel in his obituary of Dabadie published in Le Ménestrel. According to Heugel, her vocal powers were undiminished at the time of her retirement. He wrote that Dabadie had been schooled and excelled in works of the earlier classical composers such as Gluck, Sacchini, and Spontini and saw no future for herself in the newer repertoire that was coming into vogue at the Opéra.

Her husband, Bernard Dabadie, died in 1853. Zulmé died at her home on the rue Louis-le-Grand in Paris on 21 November 1877 at the age of 82. Following her funeral at the Église de la Madeleine, she was buried next to her husband in Montmartre Cemetery.
