= Pop Goes the Weasel =

Traditional English nursery rhyme

"Pop! Goes the Weasel"
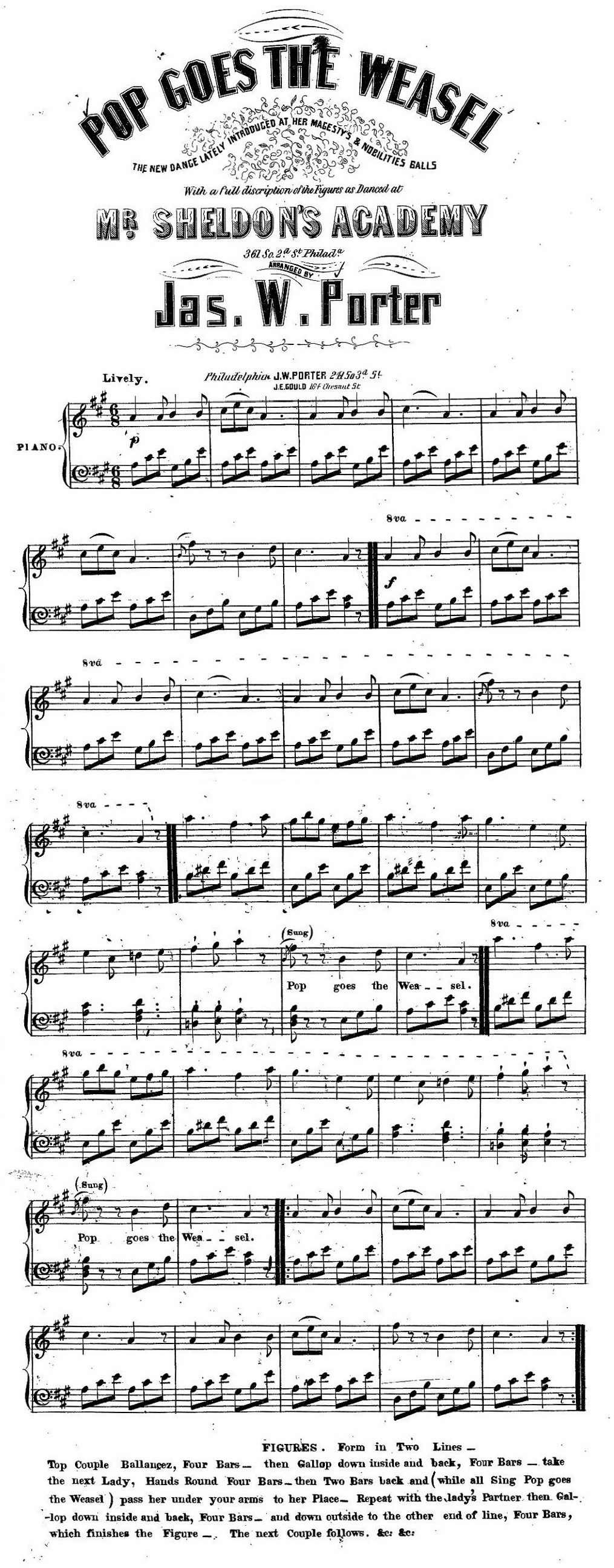
- Piano arrangement, 1853

Instrumental
- Genre: Jig
- Songwriter: Traditional

"Pop! Goes the Weasel" (Roud 5249) is a traditional old English song, a country dance, nursery rhyme, and singing game that emerged in the mid-19th century. The melody is often used in jack-in-the-box toys and is frequently played by ice cream trucks.

== Origin ==
In the early 1850s, Miller and Beacham of Baltimore published sheet music for "Pop goes the Weasel for Fun and Frolic". This is the oldest known source that pairs the name to this tune. Miller and Beacham's music was a variation of "The Haymakers", a tune dating back to the 1700s. Gow's Repository of the Dance Music of Scotland (1799 to 1820), included "The Haymakers" as a country dance or jig. One modern expert believes the tune, like most jigs, originated in the 1600s.

In June 1852, the boat Pop Goes The Weasel competed in the Durham Regatta. By December 1852, "Pop Goes The Weasel" was a popular social dance in the United Kingdom. A ball held in Ipswich on 13 December 1852 ended with "a country dance, entitled 'Pop Goes the Weasel', one of the most mirth inspiring dances which can well be imagined."

On 24 December 1852, an ad in the Birmingham Journal offered lessons in the "Pop Goes The Weasel" dance, described as a "highly fashionable Dance, recently introduced at her Majesty's and the Nobility's private soirees". On 28 December 1852, an advertisement in The Times promoted a publication that included "the new dance recently introduced with such distinguished success at the Court balls" and contained "the original music and a full explanation of the figures by Mons. E. Coulon". Eugène Coulon was a well-known dance-master. In January 1853, the Bath Chronicle featured an advertisement from dance master, Mr. T. B. Moutrie, for "instruction in the highly fashionable dances" including "Pop Goes the Weasel".

Sheet music dated 1853 at the British Library describes it as "An Old English Dance, as performed at Her Majesty's & The Nobilities Balls, with the Original Music". Also In 1853, American sheet music referred to it as "an old English Dance lately revived".

Originally, the dance was an instrumental jig except for the refrain "pop goes the weasel" which was sung or shouted as one pair of dancers moved under the arms of the other dancers. The British Library's 1853 tune is very similar to that used today but the only lyrics are "pop goes the weasel". The Library of Congress has similar sheet music with an arrangement by James W. Porter in 1853. Like its British counterpart, its only lyrics are "pop goes the weasel". Porter's version also describes the dance as taught at Mr. Sheldon's Academy in Philadelphia:

FIGURES: Form in Two Lines – Top Couple Ballaneez, Four Bars – then Gallop down inside and back, Four Bars – take the next Lady, Hands Round Four Bars – then Two Bars back and (while all Sing Pop goes the Weasel) pass her under your arms to her Place – Repeat with the lady's Partner then Gallop down the inside and back, Four Bars – and down outside to the other end of the line, Four Bars, which finishes the Figure – The next couple follows, &c. &c.

By 1854, Louis S. D. Rees "changed completely" the arrangement with "easy & brilliant variations". A modern music historian notes, "This bravura version introduces the theme as a jig, as in the original, but the variations are in 2/4 and 4/4, much better for showing off fast fingerwork. No dancing to this one!"

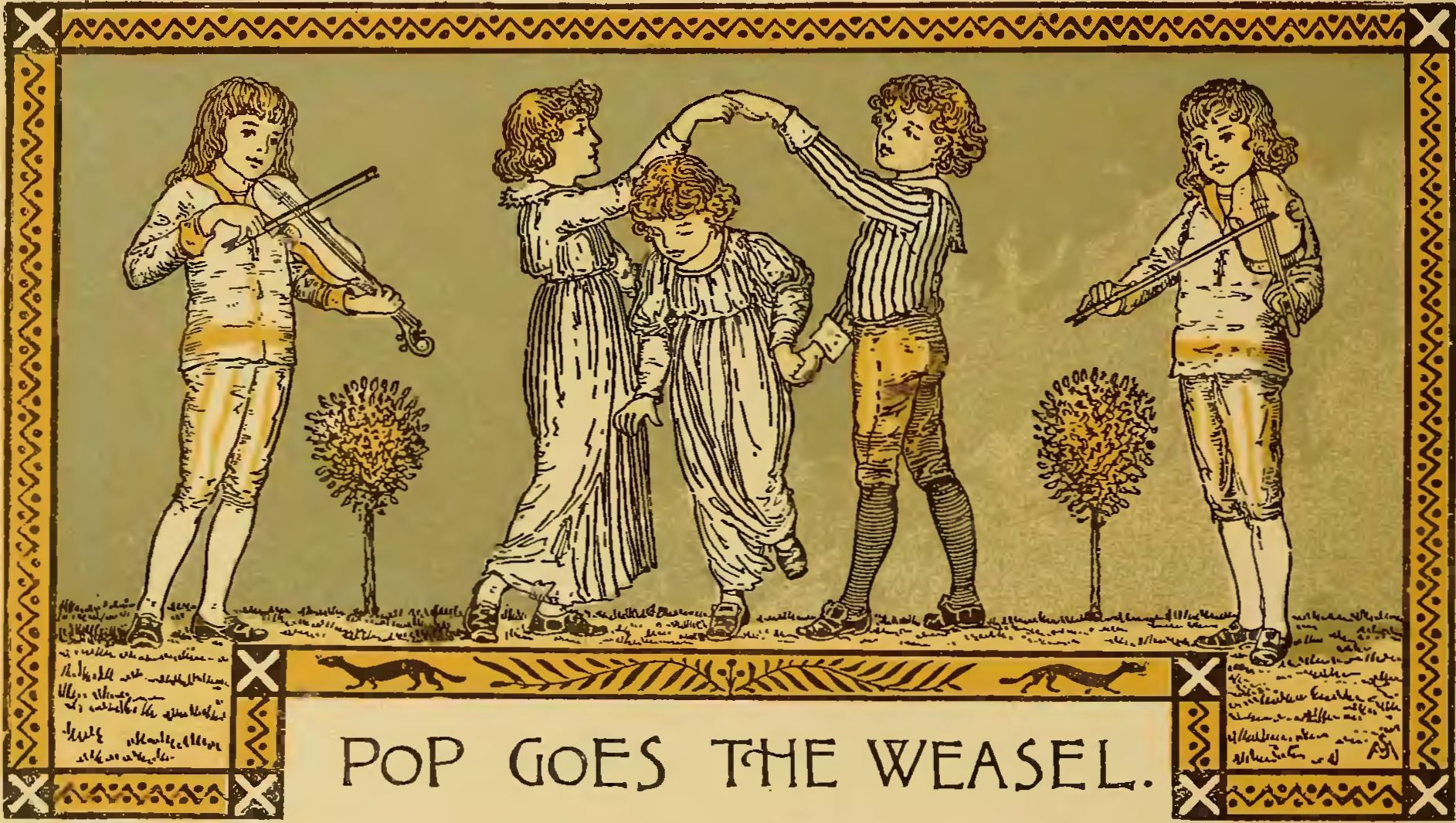
From Singing Games (1890) by Josephine Pollard. Illustration by Ferdinand Schuyler Math

The popular dance was performed on stage and in stage and dance halls. By late 1854, lyrics were added to the well-known tune, with the first singing performance possibly at the Grecian Theatre. In 1855, The National Society for Promoting the Education of the Poor in England and Wales wrote that the song, commonly played by hand–organs on the streets, had "senseless words". In their monthly newsletter, the society referred to the song as "street music" on the level of "negro tunes", saying it was "contagious and pestilent". In another newsletter, the society wrote, "Worst of all.. almost every species of ribaldry and low wit has been rendered into rhyme to suit it."

In 1856, a letter to The Morning Post read, "For many months, everybody has been bored to death with the eternal grinding of this ditty on street." Since at least the late 19th century, the nursery rhyme was used with a British children's game similar to musical chairs. The players sing the first verse while dancing around rings. There is always one ring less than the number of players. When the "pop goes the weasel" line is reached, the players rush to secure a ring. The player that fails to secure a ring is eliminated as a "weasel". There are succeeding rounds until the winner secures the last ring.

In America, the tune became a standard in minstrel shows, featuring additional verses that frequently covered politics. Charley Twigg published his minstrel show arrangement in 1855 with the refrain "Pop goes de weasel.".

== Eugène Coulon ==
Pop goes the Weasel, Jullien & Co., 1852

On 24 December 1852, the Gloucester Journal newspaper reported that "A new dance has been introduced by a Frenchman—it is called 'Pop goes the Weasel', and from the title should be a comical affair". That Frenchman was probably either Eugène Coulon or Louis-Antoine Jullien, as four days later in The Times, London, music publishers Jullien & Co. advertised "Pop goes the Weasel: the new dance recently introduced ...is now published with the original music and a full explanation of the figures, by Mons. E. Coulon." In a later advertisement George Thompson is named as the arranger of the music.

Adding support to Coulon's role is an advertisement from a dance teacher, Madame Catarina St. Louin, offering lessons in the "latest and most fashionable dances, including "Pop goes the Weasel", "La Tempéte", and "Coulon's Quadrille", by permission of M. Eugène Coulon, as lately introduced by him at Her Majesty's and the Nobility's Balls".

The Jullien & Co. publication with the original music arranged by George Thompson is the oldest known music for the dance. In it Coulon described Pop goes the Weasel "as a very old and a very animated English dance that has lately been revived among the higher classes of society", and as his instructions were soon copied by other music publishers, with and without attribution, he appears to have been the authority for the dance.

== Lyrics ==
=== British version ===
The lyrics may have predated the dance as either a rhyme or the lyrics of another song dating to the 1600s. Regardless, there are many different versions of the lyrics. In the United Kingdom, most versions share the basic verse:

Half a pound of tuppenny rice,
Half a pound of treacle.
That's the way the money goes,
Pop! Goes the weasel.

The most common additional verses are:

Up and down the City Road,
In and out the Eagle,
That's the way the money goes,
Pop! Goes the weasel.

Every night when I go out,
The monkey's on the table,
Take a stick and knock it off,
Pop! Goes the weasel.

A penny for a spool of thread
A penny for a needle,
That's the way the money goes,
Pop! Goes the weasel.

All around the cobbler's bench
The monkey chased the weasel;
The monkey thought 'twas all in fun,
Pop! Goes the weasel.

=== American variations ===
When the song crossed the Atlantic in the 1850s, the British lyrics were still changing. In the United States, the most common lyrics are different and may have a separate origin. The following lyrics were printed in Boston in 1858:

All around the cobbler's house,
The monkey chased the people.
And after them in double haste,
Pop! Goes the weasel.

The March 1860 issue of the Southern Literary Messenger published a new verse:

Queen Victoria's very sick,
Prince Albert's got the measles.
The children have the whooping cough,
And pop! Goes the weasel.

In New York in 1901, the opening lines were, "All around the chicken coop / The possum chased the weasel." By the mid-20th century, the standard United States version had replaced the "cobbler's bench" with a "mulberry bush":

All around the mulberry bush
The monkey chased the weasel;
The monkey thought it was all in fun...
Pop! Goes the weasel.

Or the standard United States version had this line.

All around the cobbler's bench
The monkey chased the weasel;
The monkey thought it was all in fun...
Pop! Goes the weasel.

In 1994, the American Folklife Center documented a version of the song with sixteen verses.

== Meaning and interpretations ==
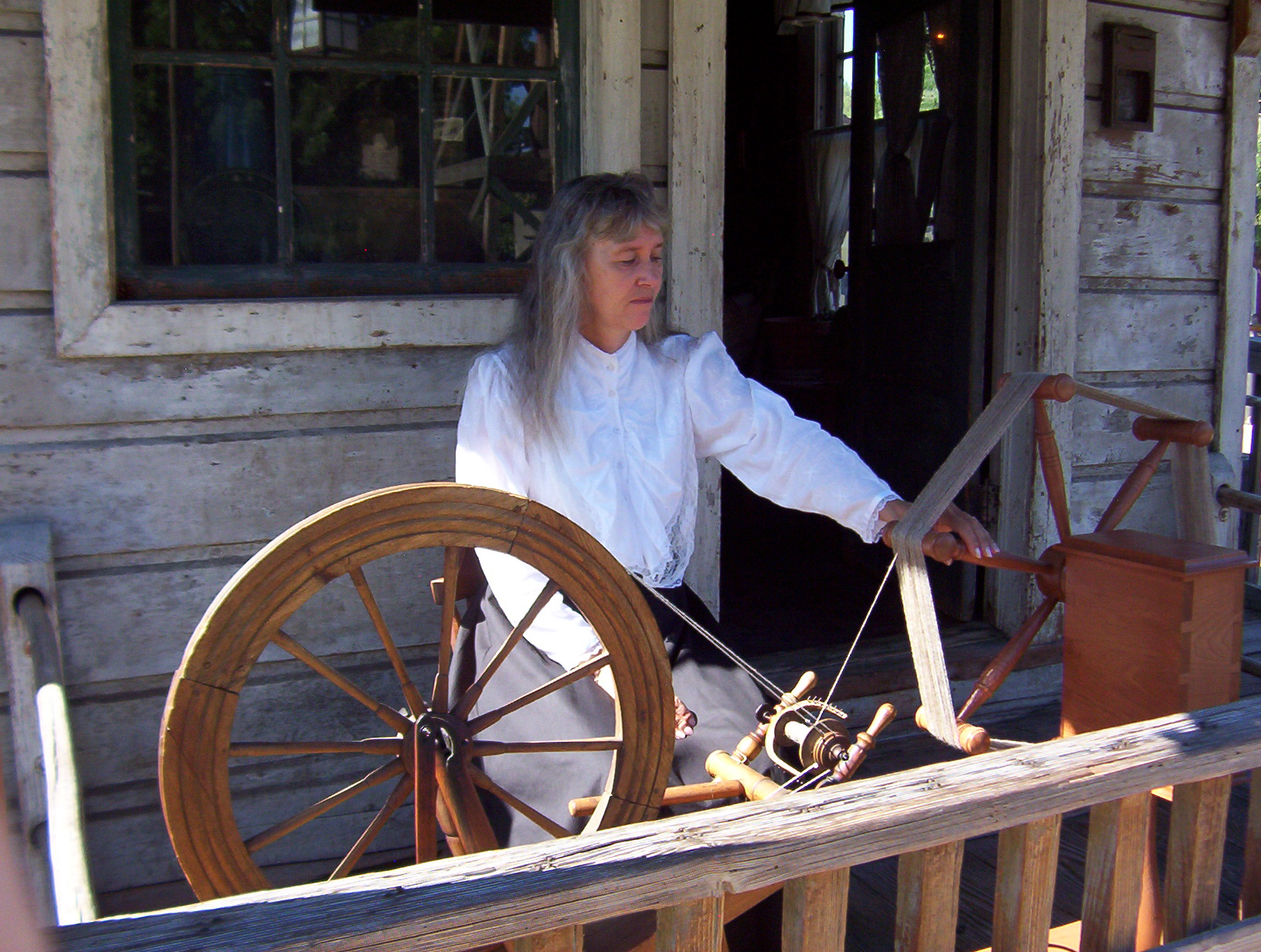
Spinner with weasel (right) and spinning wheel (left)

=== Title ===
There has been much speculation about the meaning of the phrase and song title, "Pop Goes the Weasel". Some say a weasel is a tailor's flat iron, silver-plate dishes, a dead animal, a hatter's tool (the area around City Road was known for hatters), or a spinner's weasel. One writer notes, "Weasels do pop their heads up when disturbed and it is quite plausible that this was the source of the name of the dance."

Just like the dancers to this jig, the spinner's weasel revolves, but to measure the thread or yarn produced on a spinning wheel. Forty revolutions of most weasels produce eighty yards (73 m) of yarn or a skein. The weasel's wooden gears are designed to make a popping sound after the 40th revolution to tell the spinner that the skein is completed.

Iona and Peter Opie observed that no one seemed to know what the phrase meant at the height of the dance craze in the 1850s. It may just be a nonsensical phrase. However, one further explanation links the lyrics of the popular nursery rhyme to 1800s East London Cockney rhyming slang. In this dialect "weasel" relates to "weasel and stoat", or coat, and "pop" relates the "pop shop" or pawnbrokers shop. The rhyme describes someone running short of money purchasing rice and treacle (metaphor for life's essentials); "that's the way the money goes". Subsequently, this forces them to sell (pop) their coat (weasel) to the pawnbroker (pop shop).

=== First verse ===
The first verse refers to "tuppenny rice" and "treacle" which are food. At the time, one pound of rice pudding cost twopence (pronounced tuppence). Treacle is an uncrystallized sugar syrup used as a topper to sweeten the rice pudding. A modern writer notes, it was "the cheapest and nastiest food" available to London's poor.

Some lyrics in the British version may originate with Cockney slang and rhyming slang. In the mid-19th century, "pop" was a well-known slang term for pawning something—and City Road had a well-known pawn establishment in the 1850s. In this Cockney interpretation, "weasel" is Cockney rhyming slang for "weasel and stoat" meaning "coat". Thus, to "pop the weasel" meant to pawn your coat. However, one author notes that the Cockney rhyming slang "weasel and stoat" was not used until the 1930s. Another early source says weasel was slang for silver-plate cups and dishes or anything of value that was pawnable.

In 1905, The London Globe and The New York Times published a story saying that a "weasel" was a coin purse made of weasel skin that closed with a "snap".

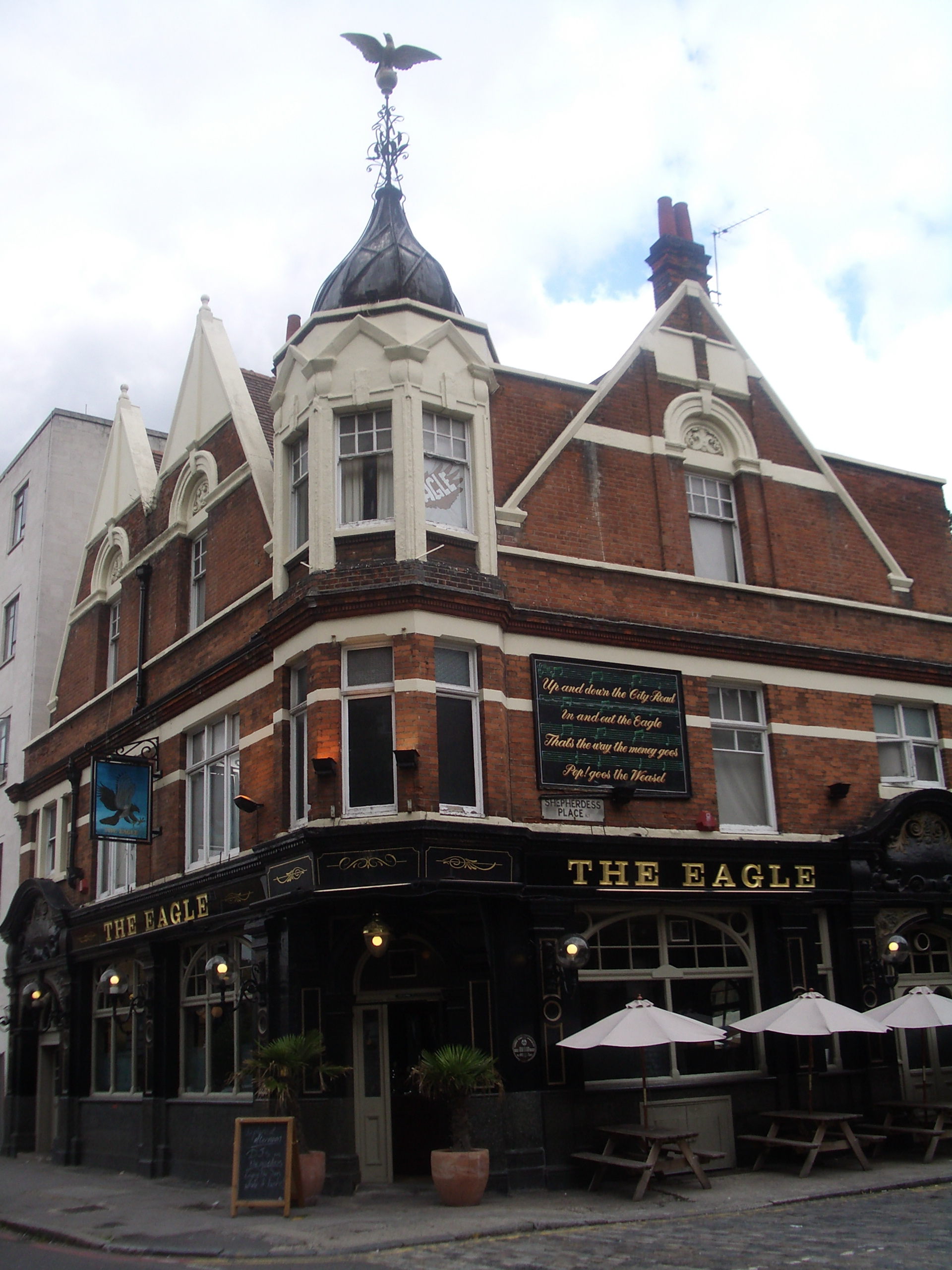
The Eagle, City Road, London

=== Second verse ===
The "Eagle" on City Road in the song's second verse may refer to a famous pub in London. The Eagle Tavern was on City Road, rebuilt as a music hall in 1825, and rebuilt in 1901 as a public house called The Eagle. As one writer concludes, "So the second verse says that visiting the Eagle causes one's money to vanish, necessitating a trip up the City Road to Uncle [the pawn shop] to raise some cash."

Today, The Eagle has the lyrics to this verse painted on a plaque on its façade.

=== Third verse ===
In the third verse, the monkey may relate to a drinking vessel. In the 19th century, sailors referred to the glazed jugs used in public houses as "monkey". A "stick" was a shot of alcohol such as rum or brandy. To "knock it off" meant to knock it back—or to drink it. The night out drinking used up all the money, conveyed in the lyrics "that's the way the money goes."

=== Fourth verse ===
The fourth verse relates to a tailor and clothing. Purchasing thread and needles may refer to paying for the items needed to work.

=== Fifth verse ===
The meaning of the fifth verse is more elusive. Here, "monkey" may refer to the slang use of the word for money worries, as in "monkey on your back". To be chased by the monkey could mean having money troubles—one way out was to pawn your coat. It also might refer to the actual animal, commonly associated with the organ grinders who played this jig.

=== Other interpretations ===
With some versions and interpretations of the lyrics, "pop goes the weasel" is said to be erotic or ribald, including a crude metaphor for sexual intercourse. In her autobiographical novel Little House in the Big Woods (1932), American author Laura Ingalls Wilder recalled her father singing these lyrics in 1873:

All around the cobbler's bench,
The monkey chased the weasel.
The preacher kissed the cobbler's wife—
Pop! goes the weasel!!

== Modern recordings ==
AllMusic lists hundreds of recordings of "Pop Goes the Weasel." Some recordings include:

- In 1938, Clay Boland created the foxtrot song "Stop Beatin' Round the Mulberry Bush" using the basic melody of the nursery rhyme with lyrics by Bickley Reichner. That year, the Boland/Reichner/Traditional song was recorded by:
  - Les Brown and His Orchestra
  - Tommy Dorsey and His Orchestra with singer Edythe Wright.
  - Jack Hylton
  - Nat Gonella and His Georgians
  - The Merry Macs
  - James Rushing with Count Basie
- In 1946, Columbia Records released actor Gene Kelly's album for children, When We Were Very Young, which included a rendition of "Pop Goes the Weasel."
- Bill Haley & His Comets recorded "Stop Beatin' Round the Mulberry Bush" in 1953.
- Bing Crosby included "Pop Goes the Weasel" in a medley on his 1961 album 101 Gang Songs.
- in 1961, British singer Anthony Newley reached number 12 on the UK singles chart with his version of the song.
- The pop group 1910 Fruitgum Company released a version of the song in April 1968.
- Ella Jenkins recorded a traditional version of the song for her 1982 album Early Early Childhood Songs on the Smithsonian Folkways label.
- In their 1991 album Derelicts of Dialect, 3rd Bass included a rap version of "Pop Goes the Weasel" which was lyrically an attack on rapper Vanilla Ice.

== Popular culture ==
=== Comedy recordings ===
- In 1964, comedian singer Allan Sherman recorded "Pop Hates the Beatles", a novelty song to the tune of "Pop Goes the Weasel" that condemns The Beatles with lyrics such as, "Ringo is the one with the drums / The others all play with him / It shows you what a boy can become / without a sense of rhythm."
- Singing "pop goes the weasel" was a punchline to a Robin Williams joke about putting a hamster in the microwave oven. Williams included this bit on his 1979 album, Reality...What a Concept.

=== Film ===
- In the 1933 Marx Brothers film Duck Soup, dictator Rufus T. Firefly (Groucho Marx) sings "The Laws of My Administration," including that "If anyone's caught taking graft / And I don't get my share / We stand 'em up against the wall / And pop goes the weasel!"
- The Three Stooges film Punch Drunks (1934) Curley "goes berserk" whenever he hears "Pop Goes the Weasel" being played on a violin, which Moe and Larry exploit for a boxing match. The movie ends with the song playing.
- The Three Stooges film Pop Goes the Easel (1935) uses "Pop Goes the Weasel" for its opening and closing tune.
- The 1974 film, The Godfather Part II features a party where the band plays "Pop Goes the Weasel" when asked to play an unfamiliar tarantella.
- In the 1999 biographical film Man on the Moon, a bartender tells Andy Kaufman, "I can't sell booze when you're singing 'Pop Goes the Weasel'" in response to the young comedian's act.
- In the 2013 film Oz the Great and Powerful, a water fairy spits water in the Wizard's face after singing "Pop Goes the Weasel".

=== Literature ===
- In 1924, Thomas William Hodgson Crosland published a novel called Pop Goes the Weasel.
- M. J. Arlidge published the novel Pop Goes the Weasel in 2005
- The song appears twice in Wilbert Awdry’sThe Railway Series; first in the 1958 book Duck and the Diesel Engine as ‘Pop Goes The Diesel’ in the story of the same name, then in the 1969 book Oliver the Western Engine as ‘Pop Goes Old Ollie’ in the story Toad Stands By. Both times the song has been rewritten to fit the narrative.

=== Music ===
- In 1855, new lyrics were published by The National Society for Promoting the Education of the Poor in England and Wales, turning it into a "School Song for Boys."
- In 1855, the Liverpool School for the Deaf and Dumb published the lyrics for their School Song, sung to the tune of "Pop Goes the Weasel."
- Sheet music published in 1857 provided an arrangement for the guitar, along with new political lyrics.
- In the early 20th century, Henry F. Gilbert included "Pop Goes the Weasel" in his unfinished Uncle Remus opera.
- Frank Tapp composed three works of large-scale variations for piano and orchestra based on the tune in 1915, 1930 and 1935.
- Trumpeter Thad Jones quoted "Pop Goes the Weasel" on a solo on the Count Basie Orchestra's 1955 recording of "April in Paris".

=== Radio ===
- The Beatles recorded a rock version of "Pop Goes The Weasel" as the theme music for the BBC Light Programme radio show Pop Go the Beatles that ran from 4 June to 24 September 1963. The British group recorded the jingle on 24 May 1963.

=== Television ===
- From 1953 through 1981, the television show Romper Room's opening and ending featured "Pop Goes the Weasel" played on a Mattel's Jack-in-the-box.
- In the golden age of the American Wrestling Association, The Crusher would bring a Jack-in-the-box to television interviews, winding the toy and singing "Pop Goes the Weasel" when the toy popped out of its box. The Crusher said the weasel was Bobby Heenan, a derisive nickname that stuck among Heenan's detractors.
- In 1975, Saturday Night Live (season 1) episode 5, Andy Kaufman lip-syncs to a child's recording of the song.
- In 1995's The Simpsons Season 6 episode "The PTA Disbands", music teacher Mr. Largo goes on strike allowing the students to play 'the forbidden music' which is "Pop Goes the Weasel"
- In 1997's NYPD Blue (season 5), part of the plot of the episode "The Truth Is Out There" deals with the meaning of the song, "Pop Goes the Weasel."
- Jamie Foxx and James Corden performed a "seductive" soul version of the song on The Late Late Show in 2017.
- In the Star Trek: The Next Generation episode, "Encounter at Farpoint", Data is trying to whistle "Pop Goes the Weasel" when Will Riker meets him for the first time. The sixth episode of the third season of Star Trek: Picard includes actual footage of this scene.
- In the November 3, 2013 episode of Masters of Sex, the character Libby gets drunk and sings "Pop Goes the Weasel" into her daiquiri.
- During the end credits in season three of Star Trek: Picard, a set of musical notes appear on screen for a melody in the key of D major in 6/8 time; it is "Pop Goes the Weasel".

=== Video games ===
- The Call of Duty Black Ops 2 Zombies map Mob of the Dead features an Easter Egg that yielded a Pop Goes the Weasel Achievement Trophy when solved.
- The 2019 video game Mortal Kombat 11 included an Easter egg associated with the Joker consisting of the letters "CCDDEGEC." These are the musical notes for the opening bar to "Pop Goes The Weasel."
- In the video game Lethal Company, an enemy called Jester will play "Pop! Goes the Weasel" before it becomes hostile.
- The 2014 video game Five Nights at Freddy's 2 features an enemy named the Puppet, which will play the "Pop! Goes The Weasel" if it is not kept calm.
- The 2009 tower defense video game Plants vs. Zombies features a Jack-in-the-Box Zombie that plays "Pop! Goes the Weasel" as it approaches the player's plants. After a period of time, the jack-in-the-box explodes, destroying the zombie and several nearby plants.
