= Mosè in Egitto =

Opera by Gioachino Rossini

- Opera by Gioachino Rossini
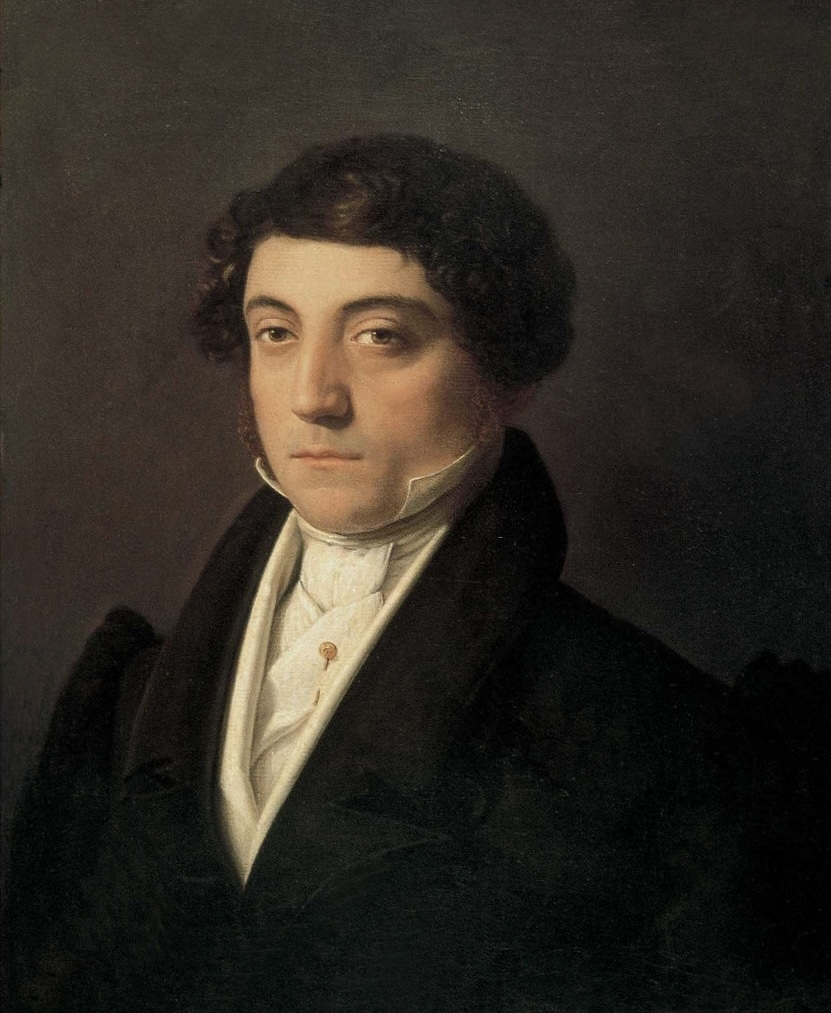
- The composer in 1815
- Librettist: Andrea Leone Tottola
- Language: Italian
- Based on: L'Osiride by Francesco Ringhieri
- Premiere: 5 March 1818; Teatro San Carlo, Naples

Moïse et Pharaon
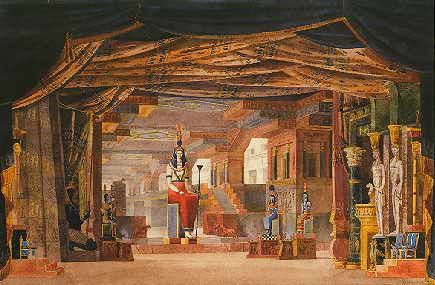
- Scene for the third act in the 1827 production
- Librettist: Luigi Balocchi; Victor-Joseph Étienne de Jouy
- Language: French
- Premiere: 26 March 1827; Salle Le Peletier, Paris

Mosè in Egitto (Italian: [moˈzɛ in eˈdʒitto]; "Moses in Egypt") is a three-act opera written by Gioachino Rossini to an Italian libretto by Andrea Leone Tottola, which was based on a 1760 play by Francesco Ringhieri, L'Osiride. It premièred on 5 March 1818 at the recently reconstructed Teatro San Carlo in Naples, Italy.

In 1827 Rossini revised and greatly enlarged the work to a four-act French libretto: Moïse et Pharaon, ou Le passage de la Mer Rouge (pronounced [mɔ.iz e faʁaɔ̃ u lə pasaʒ d(ə) la mɛʁ ʁuʒ]; "Moses and Pharaoh, or The Crossing of the Red Sea"). This was written by Luigi Balocchi and Victor-Joseph Étienne de Jouy. The première took place in the Salle Le Peletier of the Paris Opera on 26 March that year.

Riccardo Muti and many scholars consider Moïse et Pharaon, along with Guillaume Tell, to be among Rossini's greatest achievements:

I prefer it because Rossini himself preferred it. Don't get me wrong. Mosè in Egitto is a wonderful opera, but it remains very much a mere sketch for Moïse et Pharaon. And it's not just me who says that, but the great Rossini himself.

== Composition history ==
Mosè in Egitto, 1818

The opera was loosely based on the Exodus from Egypt of the Israelites, led by Moses, rendered agreeable to the opera stage by introducing a love theme, in which the Pharaoh's son Amenophis plans to prevent their departure, since he loves the Israelite Anaïs.

The 1818 opera opens as the plague of darkness is dispelled by Moses' prayer, and it ends with the spectacle of the parting of the Red Sea and the drowning of Pharaoh's host, which "elicited howls of derision" at the clumsy machinery of its staging at the premiere, though the opera surmounted its technical failings and was a hit. Billed in 1818 as an azione tragico-sacra, the sacred drama with some features of the oratorio circumvented proscriptions of secular dramatic performances during Lent.

Rossini slightly revised the opera in 1819, when he introduced Moses' prayer-aria "Dal tuo stellato soglio", which became one of the most popular opera pieces of the day and which inspired a set of variations for violin and piano by Niccolò Paganini. Both survive in concert performance.

Moïse et Pharaon, 1827

The greatly enlarged work set to a French libretto was composed with so much additional music, including a substantial ballet, as to warrant a new title, Moïse et Pharaon, ou Le passage de la Mer Rouge (Moses and Pharaoh, or The Crossing of the Red Sea) (pronounced [mɔiːz e faʁaɔ̃ u lə pasaːʒ də la mɛːʁ ʁuːʒ]), and was seen to be a separate and new opera alongside its Naples progenitor.

== Performance history ==
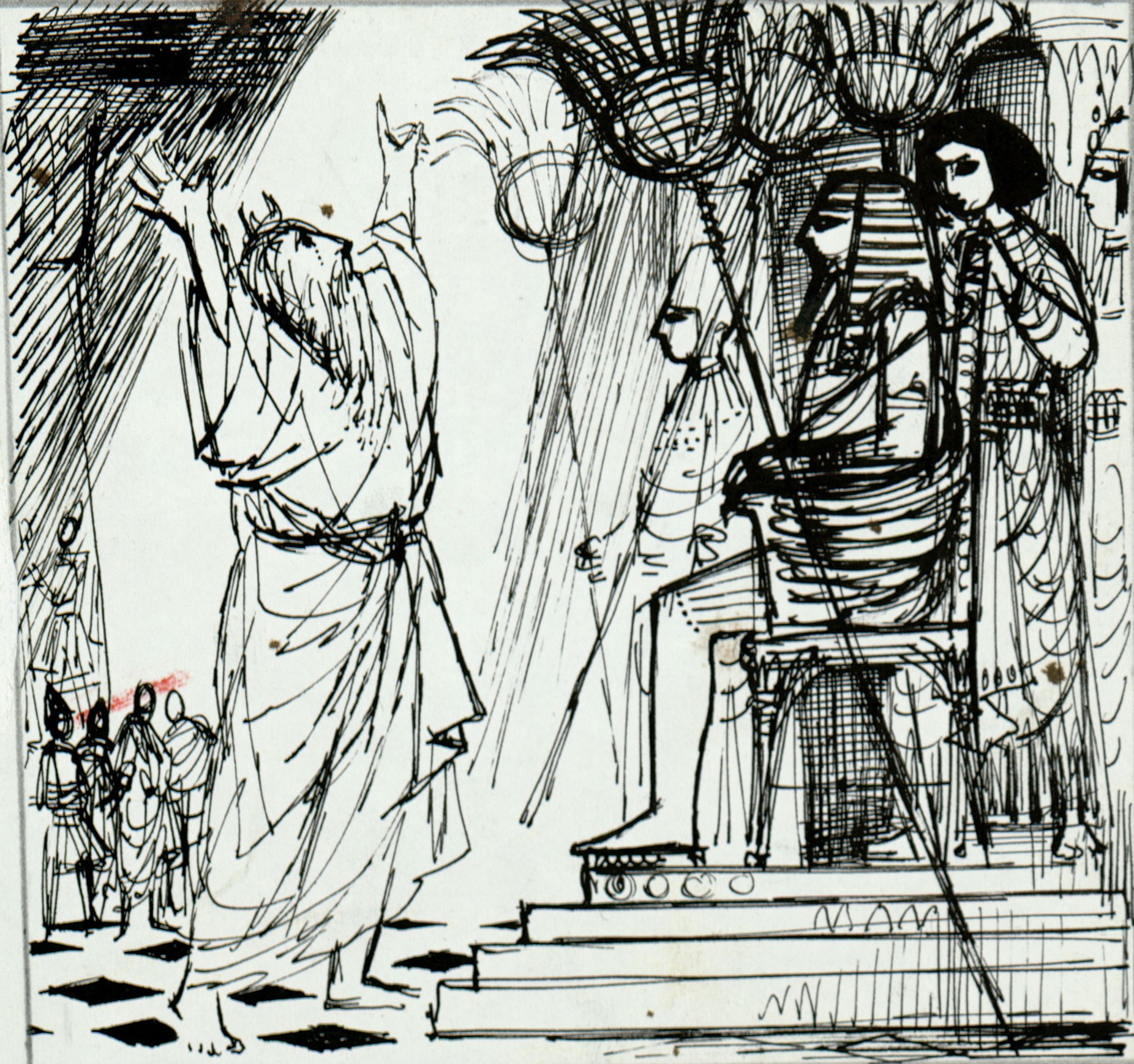
Disegno per copertina di libretto, drawing for Mosè in Egitto (undated).

French audiences had already seen Mosè in Egitto – given its Parisian premiere by the Théâtre-Italien at the Salle Le Peletier on 20 October 1822 – before Rossini revised it again, this time in French, for the Paris Opéra.

The French version, in four acts with a ballet, premiered on 26 March 1827 under the title Moïse et Pharaon, ou Le Passage de la Mer Rouge. The first libretto from Naples was translated and augmented by Luigi Balocchi and Victor-Joseph Étienne de Jouy, who would later co-write the libretto for Rossini's final opera Guillaume Tell. As is noted on Expatica, "this second version proved such a runaway box-office success that it was performed no less than 100 times between its premiere in 1827 and 1838".

20th century and beyond

The Rossini Opera Festival, in Rossini's home town of Pesaro, has presented the opera periodically since 1980, beginning with a 1983 production by Pier Luigi Pizzi and revived in 1985. It did not re-appear until 2011 when it was seen in a production by Graham Vick. There had, however, been concert performances of various versions of the opera in New York by the Collegiate Chorale and the Sacred Opera Society.

Mosè had "remained virtually unheard in Britain since a concert in 1822", until a production was staged by Welsh National Opera in the 1964/5 season in Cardiff, Llandudno and London. London's Royal Opera House gave it in May/June 1994.

Welsh National Opera staged it again in autumn 2014 in Cardiff and on tour. Opinions were mixed.

In the US, Mosè in Egitto had not been heard in Chicago since 1865, but it was presented in that city by Chicago Opera Theater in 2010 and given by New York City Opera in April 2013.

As Moise et Pharaon it was given at La Scala in 2003, and again as part of the 2009 Salzburg Festival under Muti.

== Roles ==
Roles, voice types, premiere casts in Naples and Paris
Role Naples version / Paris version	Voice type	Naples premiere cast, 5 March 1818 (Conductor: Nicola Festa)	Paris premiere cast: revised version, 26 March 1827 (Conductor: Henri Valentino)
Mosè / Moïse (Moses)	bass	Michele Benedetti	Nicholas-Prosper Levasseur
Faraone / Pharaon (Pharaoh)	bass	Raniero Remorini	Henri-Bernard Dabadie
Amaltea / Sinaïde, his wife	soprano	Frederike Funck	Zulmé Dabadie
Osiride / Aménophis, their son	tenor	Andrea Nozzari	Adolphe Nourrit
Elcia / Anaï, a Hebrew girl	soprano	Isabella Colbran	Laure Cinti-Damoreau
Aronne / Eliézer (Aaron)	tenor	Giuseppe Ciccimarra	Alexis Dupont
Amenofi / Marie (Miriam), Moses' sister	mezzo-soprano	Maria Manzi	Mori
Mambre / Aufide, a priest	tenor	Gaetano Chizzola	Ferdinand Prévôt
(no role) / Osiride, the High Priest	bass		Bonel
(no role) / A mysterious voice	bass		Bonel

== Instrumentation ==
The score calls for: 2 flutes/2 piccolos, 2 oboes, 2 clarinets, 2 bassoons, 4 horns, 2 trumpets, 3 trombones, serpent, timpani, bass drum, cymbals, triangle, Banda Turca, harp, strings.

Stage band: piccolo, quartino, 4 clarinets, 2 horns, 4 trumpets, 2 trombones, serpent, bass drum

== Synopsis ==
Place: Egypt
Time: Around 1230 B.C.

=== Act 1 ===
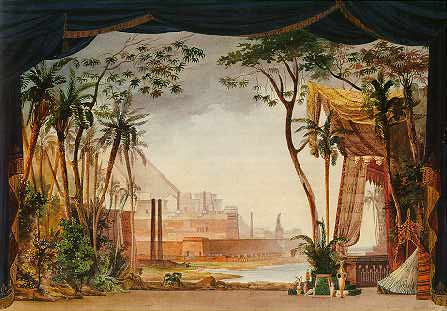
Act 1 set design of the original 1827 production

Darkness envelopes Egypt. It has been brought about by God in order to punish the Pharaoh and his people because he has failed to allow the Hebrews to leave the country for the Promised Land across the Red Sea. Moses is brought in and the Pharaoh declares that, when the sun shines again, he will release the captives. Cautioned by his brother Aaron not to believe the Egyptian leader, nevertheless Moses pleads to God and light returns.

However, because the Pharaoh's son Osiride is in love with the Hebrew girl Elcia and does not want to see her leave with her people, he persuades the High Priest, Mambre, to help him. The Priest does not believe in Moses' powers and he agrees to find a way to prevent the exodus by encouraging the Egyptians to revolt against allowing the Hebrews to depart. The Pharaoh then withdraws his promise and warns Moses that any Hebrew who tries to escape will be killed. Amaltea, Pharaoh's wife, has secretly converted and she tries to intervene, but to no avail. Moses then threatens further punishment and is set upon by Osiride's soldiers, intent upon killing him, but Pharaoh arrives in time to prevent it. Moses then prays for fire to rain down upon the country.

=== Act 2 ===
Pharaoh orders the Hebrews to leave at once, so as to avoid the curse placed on his people. Then, telling his son that he has negotiated a treaty whereby Osiride will be married to the Princess of Assyria, he does not understand why his son hears his announcement with little enthusiasm.

Shortly afterwards, Moses learns that Osiride has kidnapped Elcia, but Aaron knows where they are hiding. Amaltea is warned and accompanies him to find the lovers.

Together in the cave, Osiride tells Elcia of his father's plans for him and he suggests that they can live together in hiding in the countryside. The Queen with her guards and Aaron interrupt the two lovers, but they refuse to separate and Osiris declares that he intends to give up the throne.

Meanwhile, the Pharaoh once again reverses himself and states that he will not allow the captives to leave, fearing that the Hebrews will support Egypt's enemies. Outraged, Moses declares that the Crown Prince and all the firstborn males of the country will be hit by a divine lightning strike. Pharaoh orders Moses to be put in chains, and, to protect his son from the prophecy, declares Osiride to be his co-ruler and that he will be the one to proclaim the death sentence on Moses. Elcia then comes forward revealing her relationship with Osiride and begging him to free Moses and his people. She tries to persuade him to accept his destiny and marry the royal princess of Assyria. But Osiride remains adamant and immediately orders that Moses be killed. As he does so, he falls dead from being struck by a bolt of lightning.

=== Act 3 ===
On the shores of the Red Sea

Having crossed the desert, the Hebrews arrive on the shores of the Red Sea, but find themselves unable to continue their journey to the Promised Land. Leading his people and telling them to wait for God's action, Moses prays. As the advancing Egyptians appear, the Hebrews are panicking, but Moses touches the waters with his staff and the Red Sea opens to provide a pathway to the opposite shore. Following closely behind, the Egyptians, led by Mambre and Pharaoh, enter the gap in the waters but they are swamped by the waves which close over them.

== Recordings ==
Year	Cast: Mosè, Amaltea, Osiride, Elcia, Faraone	Conductor, opera house and orchestra	Label
1956	Nicola Rossi-Lemeni, Rosanna Carteri, Agostino Lazzari, Anita Cerquetti, Giuseppe Taddei	Tullio Serafin, RAI National Symphony Orchestra and the RAI Chorus	CD: MYTO, Cat: 00251
1956	Nicola Rossi-Lemeni, Bruna Rizzoli, Agostino Lazzari, Caterina Mancini, Giuseppe Taddei	Tullio Serafin, Teatro San Carlo di Napoli Orchestra and Chorus	CD: Philips, Cat: 442 100-2
1968	Nicolai Ghiaurov, Shirley Verrett, Giampaolo Corradi, Teresa Żylis-Gara, Mario Petri	Wolfgang Sawallisch, RAI National Symphony Orchestra and the RAI Chorus	CD: Frequenz, Cat: 043-022
1981	József Gregor, Júlia Hamari, András Molnár, Magda Kalmár, Sándor Sólyom-Nagy	Lamberto Gardelli, Hungarian State Opera Orchestra and Hungarian Radio and Television Chorus	CD: Hungaroton, Cat: HCD 12290-92
1987	Ruggero Raimondi, Zehava Gal, Salvatore Fisichella, June Anderson, Siegmund Nimsgern	Claudio Scimone, Philharmonia Orchestra and the Ambrosian Opera Chorus (Ambrosian Singers)	CD: Philips, Cat: 420 109-2
1993	Roberto Scandiuzzi, Gloria Scalchi, Ezio Di Cesare, Mariella Devia, Michele Pertusi	Salvatore Accardo, Teatro San Carlo di Napoli Orchestra and Chorus (Audio and video recordings of a performance (or of performances) in the Teatro San Carlo di Napoli)	DVD: House of Opera; Cat: DVDBB 2113
1997	Michele Pertusi, Mariana Pentcheva, Luigi Petroni, Elisabeth Norberg-Schulz, Eldar Aliev	Vladimir Jurowski, Orchestra del Teatro Comunale di Bologna and Prague Chamber Choir	CD: Fonè, Cat: ROF 199
2007	Lorenzo Regazzo, Rossella Bevacqua, Giorgio Trucco, Akie Amou, Wojtek Gierlach	Antonino Fogliani, Württemberg Philharmonic Orchestra (Recording of performances at the Rossini in Wildbad Festival)	CD: Naxos, Cat: 8.660220-21
2012	Riccardo Zanellato, Olga Senderskaya, Yijie Shi, Sonia Ganassi, Alex Esposito	Roberto Abbado, Teatro Comunale di Bologna orchestra and chorus, Graham Vick, stage director	DVD: Naxos Records; Cat:OA1093D
2020	Alexey Birkus, Silvia Dalla Benetta, Patrick Kabongo, Elisa Balbo, Baurzhan Anderzhanov	Fabrizio Maria Carminati, Virtuosi Brunensis, Górecki Chamber Choir, (Recording of performances at the Rossini in Wildbad Festival)	CD: Naxos Records; Cat:8660473-75
