= Eugène Germain Coulon =

French dance teacher (1808–1891)

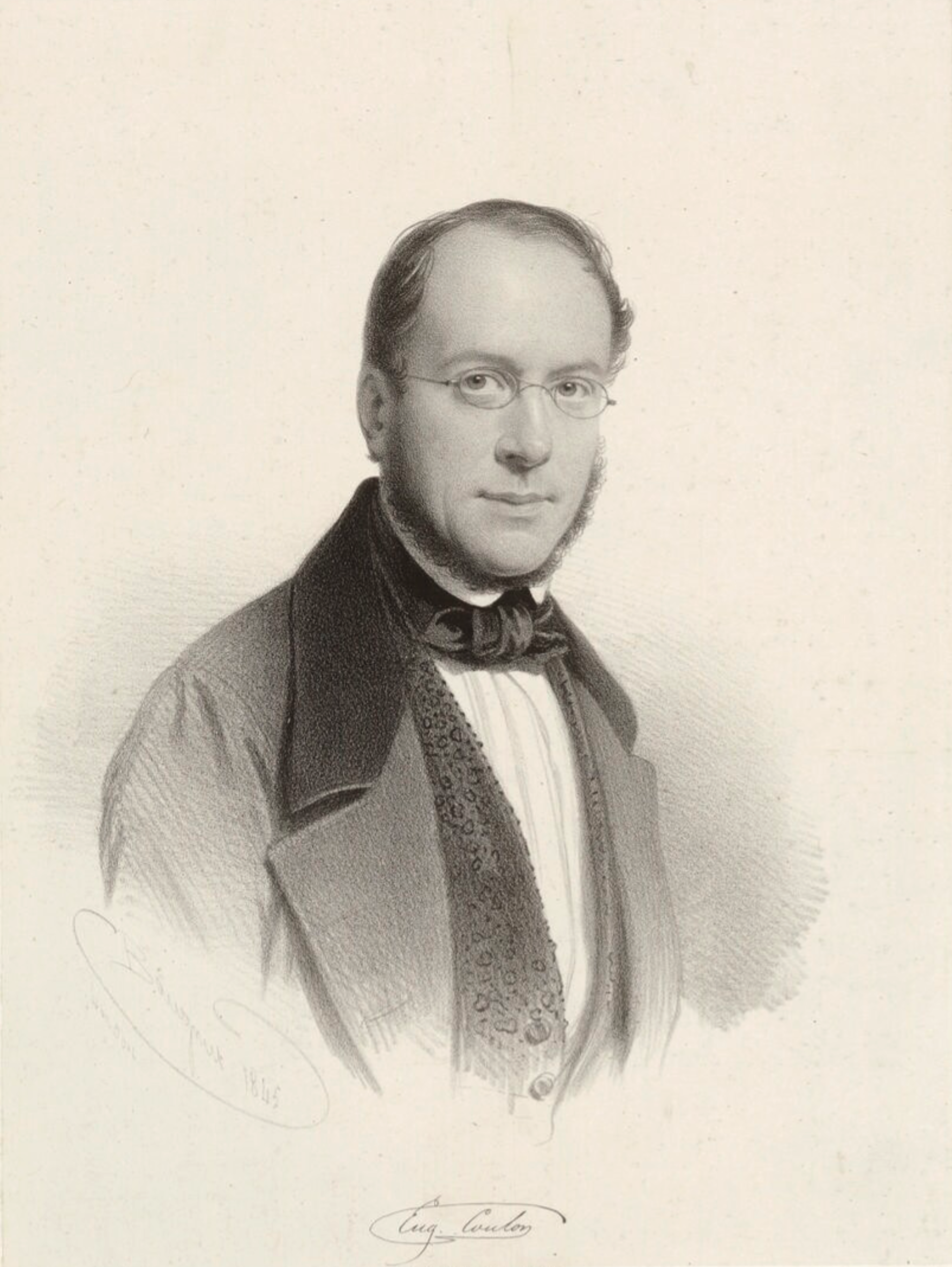
1845 lithograph of Eugène Coulon by Charles Baugniet

Eugène Germain Coulon (1808–1891) was a respected dance teacher who played an important role in the development of dance in the ballrooms and salons in the United Kingdom in the mid-nineteenth century. In London he was known as the French dance master and brought "the edifying influences, the reformative attributes and civilising refinements of society - 'the art of dancing' - to broader populations". He taught a generation of dance teachers in the UK.

== Family ==
Born, April 1808, in Paris into a famous french dancing family, his father was Jean-François Coulon and his father's sister, Anne-Jacqueline Coulon was a dancer with Paris Opera from 1778 to 1802. His brother, Antoine-Louis Coulon (1796–1849), was a principal dancer in Paris and London who danced with Pauline Duvernay, Fanny Bias and Pauline Leroux and became known as a demi-caractère dancer.

In Paris on 29 April 1833 Coulon married Louise Zulmé (née) Leroux (1804–1874), a singing teacher who possibly also sang in recital and may have been the Louise-Zulmé Le Roux listed in Constant Pierre's history of the Paris Conservatoire as born 20 March 1804 and likely confused with Zulmée Leroux, who was awarded 1st Prize for Singing in 1819, married Bernard Dabadie in 1821, and died in 1877. There is a photograph of Madame Coulon in the National Portrait Gallery, London.

Four children are known, three dying at birth or soon after, Leon Gustave (31 October 1834), Juliette Marie (10 June 1836), Louis Emile (23 February 1839) and a daughter Jeanne Louise Coulon (1832–1892) who was an accomplished pianist and music teacher but took her own life seven months after the death of her father. There is a photograph of Mademoiselle Coulon in the National Portrait Gallery, London.

== Maître de dance ==
He trained for the stage but ill-health obliged a change of career in 1830 and he obtained a position at The Hague as professor to the royal family of the Prince of Orange. This lasted nearly seven years and he then moved to London at the invitation of his brother Antoine, who had opened a dance academy with Jas. Hervet d'Egville (possibly James Harvey D'Egville) in 1832.

When the Polka became the rage in Paris he travelled there and consulted with Henri Cellarius and his reputation was established when he introduced the dance to English ballrooms and "as the best Parisian teacher", was "specially sent for by the Almack's patronesses to introduce the dance to their select circle". One newspaper wrote that he "introduced the Polka that chased away prudery, banished reserve, and taught all classes that dancing is and always was meant to be the foot's interpretation of the heart" and "has converted the solemn ball room into the scene of innocent revelry". A page of the paper was devoted to his portrait.

At about this time he moved from 47, which could accommodate 200 dancers, to 48 Great Marlborough Street as it was "larger and more commodious". In 1852 or 1853 he moved to 22 Gt Marlborough St., and then to 5 Bulstrode St, Cavendish-square in 1867.

He continued his collaboration with Cellarius as well as Jean Coralli and Eugene Laborde, the other principal dance teachers in Paris at the time, to distil the new elaborate and theatrical dances appearing on the stages of Europe into figures suitable for the ballrooms of France and the UK and to encourage uniformity in the execution of those dances in those ballrooms. To that end in the next few years he would also introduce the Mazurka, Redowa, Valse à deux temps.

By 1860 he had taught 104 dance teachers across 56 towns in the UK. At the time to have been trained by Monsieur Coulon was the highest qualification for a teacher and remained so for fifty years.

He was still teaching at the age of 80 and died at 83 after a long illness

== Description of dance figures ==
Coulon's descriptions of dance steps are on many music sheets and were collected in the books, The Ball-Room Polka Cotillon and Valse à Deux Tems as taught by Mons. E. Coulon in 1844, and Coulon's Handbook; Containing all the New and Last Fashionable Dances,. There were at least four editions of this book, three published by Jullien Co., in 1851, 1852, and 1860 and one by Hammond and Co. in 1873

== Art ==
Monsieur Coulon's Dancing Class is a painting by Albert Ludovici Jnr (1852–1932). It secured Ludovici's admission to the Society of British Artists and when on display at the fifty sixth Exhibition of the Society of British Artists in 1879 it was described as "one of the most charming works in the exhibition". A sketch of the painting is on page 157 of The Magazine of Art Gift Book.

In addition to the Baugniet lithograph shown above there are two other portraits of Eugène Coulon in the National Portrait Gallery.
