= Giovanni Inchindi =

Belgian opera singer

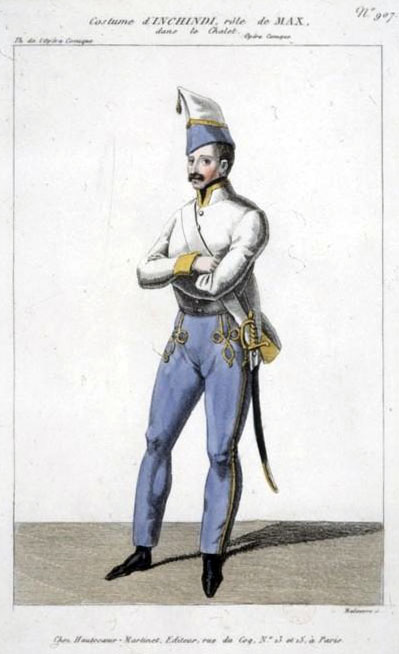
Inchindi as Max in Le chalet

Jean-François Hennekindt, also known as Giovanni Inchindi (12 March 1798 – 23 August 1876) was a Belgian opera singer born in Bruges who began his career as a tenor but went on to become one of the premier baritones in France and abroad, with a voice known for its ease in both low and high passages and adaptability to different kinds of roles.

He studied singing in his hometown and debuted at the Théâtre royal d'Anvers as Cinna in La vestale. In 1822 he was admitted to the Paris Conservatoire, where he studied singing with Plantade and declamation with Baptiste the elder. The next year, having won a prize for his singing, he debuted at the Paris Opera as a cover for the famous basse-taille Henri-Etienne Dérivis and François Laÿs. The Pasha in Le caravanne du Caïre and Œdipe in Œdipe à Colone were his greatest successes. He spent 1823, 1824, and 1825 at the Opéra, and as his vocal means were not fully developed and he was forced to switch between bass and tenor. He created the role of Capo dei Galli in Pharamond of Boiëldieu, Berton, Kreuzer and Le Sueur.

Being frustrated with the lack of encouragement he had gotten thus far, he moved to Venice and Barcelona to study belcanto. It was in Italy that he changed his name to the more Italian "Giovanni Inchindi". He appeared as Lusignano in the premiere production of Vincenzo Bellini's Zaira in May 1829 in Parma. He returned to Paris, but now in the "Théâtre italien" a virtuoso baritone and made his second debut on October 1, 1829, in the role of Assur in Rossini's Semiramide. His critics remarked on how his technique and voice had improved, become fuller and more beautiful.

In 1830 he moved to Madrid, performing in a lot of Rossini operas. He created the role of Cristobal Colon in the opera with that name of Ramon Carnicer. In the season 1833-34 he performed in Italy again in Bologna and Rome, and was then taken up in the Opéra-Comique in Paris.

In 1834 he created the role of Max in Adolphe Adam's opera Le chalet, which was a triumph for him—so much so that this role came to define the low baritone voice part in France for many decades. In 1835 he created the roles of Duc de Cavalcanti in La Marquise of Adam, Tchin-Kao in Le Cheval de Bronze of Esprit Auber and the Father of Amélie in La Grande Duchesse of Carafa. In 1836 he created the role of Prince Aldobrandi in Actéon of Auber, an opera written for Cinti-Damoreau and Inchindi. In 1836-37 he sang mainly in Ghent and London. In 1837 he performed in Italy, mainly in Genua. In 1839 he only performed in concerts as well in Madrid as in Paris and made a concert tour in the French provinces and Paris in 1840–42. In autumn 1842 he performed in the Brussel Monnaie. In 1843 he is back in Paris and makes also a long concert tour with Camillo Sivori in the UK and Ireland until the end of 1845. He end his career in Madrid in 1845–46.

He spent his later years between Madrid, Brussels and Paris but died suddenly on a trip to Brussels in 1876.

During his career his repertoire also included Figaro in Rossini's Il barbiere di Siviglia, Aliprando in his Matilde di Shabran, and Donizetti's Belisario.
