= That's the way the money goes =

Famous Phrase

The phrase "that's the way the money goes", or "how the money goes", is used to draw attention to profligacy and waste of the public purse, church funds etc., or just the day to day cost of living. It can be found in texts going back to 1707. Around the 1840s it was sometimes enclosed in quotation marks referencing popular songs and rhymes that contained the line.

== History ==
The first song, "That's the way the money goes", appeared in 1835. It was written by Joseph Edwards Carpenter with music arranged by John Harroway and by 1837 it was being sung at City Festivals, London Concerts and the New Grecian Saloon in the Eagle Tavern, Shoreditch.

Another song, "The Dollars", by William Evans Burton was published in 1837 in Burtons Comic Songster. Retitled "The way the money goes", it appeared with music in the January 1838 edition of The Gentleman's Magazine - a journal Burton also edited. It was published in Philadelphia but available in Britain. The song was being sung in concerts in New York in 1842 and in 1841, again as "The Dollars", was reprinted in the book "American Melodies".

In 1839 a poem was printed in several newspapers in Britain and the USA under several titles, one being "How does the money go". It is a wife's detailed accounting to her husband of the disbursement of his wages of one pound one shilling.

The line also appeared in the slip songs, "England's stagnation! Or, I wonder where the Money is gone" and "Fifteen shillings a week". The latter also being a costing of the household expenses by a wife to her husband. These sheets would have been printed around 1850 but the songs are probably older. "Fifteen shillings a week" may reference the wage Scrooge paid his clerk, Bob Cratchit, in A Christmas Carol (1843).

The phrase is probably best known as the penultimate line in many stanzas of the playground rhyme "Pop Goes the Weasel". Pop Goes the Weasel, originally an old country dance, had in 1852 become fashionable again following "the Queen's use of it at Court Balls". As with "that's the way the money goes", it then, in 1853, became the subject of comic songs and possibly at concerts that year the two phrases became linked.

At the Cremorne Gardens in 1853, W. Lambert Edmonds, was singing "Pop goes the weasel" by W. R. Mandale, and may have also performed Carpenter's "That's the way the money goes" as he did sing other songs by Carpenter that year.

Also that year both "Pop goes the weasel" and "That's the way the money goes" were appearing in verse in newspaper advertisements. Hyams emporium in separate advertisements used both phrases.

The first known appearance of the two lines together was not until March 1854 in Edinburgh. At a time of preparations for the Crimean War, and referring to Nicholas I of Russia, butcher and baker boys there were singing:

King Nic has got the sma'pox,
I wish he had the measles;
That's the way the money goes;
Pop goes the weasel

A stanza about a cotton reel and needle has survived through to the present day. An early version appeared in September 1854.

Up and down, about the town,
Sowing with my needle.
That's the way the money goes,
Pop goes the Weasel.
A halfpenny for a cotton ball,
A penny for a needle,
That's the way the money goes,
Pop goes the Weasel.

The City Road/Eagle couplet was being sung in the street by April 1854 but the earliest known version with the line "That's the way the money comes", was in April 1855 in James Planché's Easter Extravaganza. The word comes in italics suggesting a change from goes.

Up and down the City Road,
In and out the Eagle,
That's the way the money comes,
Pop goes the weasel!

== Lyrics ==
THAT'S THE WAY THE MONEY GOES
By J. E. Carpenter
Air—"Monsieur Nong Tong Paw".

In every passing scene of life,
With pleasure or with sorrow rife,
No matter which the case maybe,
You still require the £. S. D.;
As schoolboy first, who homeward hies,
You spend your pence in cakes or pies,
On hoops, or peg-tops—arrows—bows—
And that's the way the money goes !

These childish toys are cast aside
And you resolve to take a bride,
You "pop the question" to some fair,
And then for keeping house prepare;
Of goods you order not a few,
With tables, chairs, a child's-chair too,
And small etceteras such as those,
And that's the way the money goes !

Now older but not wiser grown,
You find a married life is prone,
To drain your coffers, mar your peace,
Expenses ev'ry day increase :
Yo try in vain your wife to please,
Pay servants, nurses, doctor's fees,
Buy cordials, dresses, baby's clothes
And that's the way the money goes !

Your wife's for ever gadding out
To concert, opera, ball, or rout,
And when you ever hint of blame
She tells you others do the same:
Your daughters, too, who're growing up,
Invite a host of folks to sup,
You treat their friends, and feast their beaux,
And that's the way the money goes !

You speculate for worldly gain
And try a fortune to obtain,
Buy shares in each attractive scheme,
Of fame and wealth, and honour dream :
Some banks—quite safe—attention claims,
You calculate a world of gains,
But ere a year the shutters close,
And that's the way the money goes !

Or if perchance you should contrive
To make each speculation thrive,
Then poor relations by the score
Come up to town your life to bore,
Upon your kindness they prevail,
You're bound for one, another bail
They both abscond, on you impose,
And that's the way the money goes !

You're just enjoying life when death
Comes in and robs you of your breath,
You've spent in toil a whole life through
To save a thousand pounds or two :
THen all the cash, so hardly got
Goes to some rakish, drunken sot,
As soon as you have "cock'd your toes;"
And that's the way the money goes !

Encore verses

You patronize some "fancy fair",
And take your wife and daughters there,
But find as they your pockets clear,
That taking pleasure's very dear :
To Epsom with some quondam friend,
You go "the Derby Day" to spend,
A hundred lose to calm your woes,
And that's the way the money goes !

Again your troubles to renew
There's rent forever coming due,
And taxes, tithes and rates combine
Each frugal plan to undermine;
Another bar to your delight,
Your largest tenant bolts by night,
Three quarters rent, of course, he owes,
And that's the way the money goes !

In ev'ry lane and ev'ry street,
You're alteration sure to meet,
For building up, and pulling down
Employs the cash of half the town.
Gin palaces by scores abound,
In ev'ry quarter they are found,
The liquor there like water flows,
And that's the way the money goes !

You try in vain whate'er you do
To save a hundred pounds or two,
The army and the navy all
For their support upon you call;
In power.d wig and gown array'd
The placeman struts,—'tis you who've paid
To grease his worship's ruby nose,
And that's the way the money goes !

The Dollars
By W. E. Burton
Air - Mounseer Nongtongpaw

We find throughout this earthly ball,
The "one thing needfull" governs all;
Nobles, commons, dunces, scholars,
Nothing's done without the dollars
That money flies the poet sings,
On paper, or on on golden wings,
This solemn truth each biped knows,
It makes him look straight down his nose,
To see the way the money goes.

The bachelor, tired of single life,
Resolves to venture on a wife;
His house is furnish'd all in taste,
And purse and pocket run to waste.
She orders sofas, couches, chairs,
Curtains, and carpets, and china wares,
French clocks, French lamps, and French quelque chose,
Each day her taste more costly grows—
And that's the way the money goes.

Ere twelve months their course have run,
His wife presents him with a son,
Instead of making the pappy glad,
Th' expenses almost drive him mad.
Child's cap, child's frock, child's cradle, child's chair,
Doctor and nurse, expensive pair —
Cordials, cake, and wine o'erflows,
Christening frolic— friends in rows,
And that's the way the money goes.

All lottery tickets turn up blanks,
And those who play at pharo banks,
At poko, brag, or loo, or bluff,
Must all be sure to lose enough.
Of horses fond, you go to a race,
And back your favourite's time and pace;
Some better nag does him oppose —
You lose — and cursing fortune's throws,
Say, that's the way my money goes.

Encore verses

The ladies, by their love of dress,
Cause mankind's pockets deep distress,
Fashion's follies each one follows,
And plays the devil with our dollars.
Your wife just chucks you under the chin,
Hats, caps, gowns, shawls, are order'd in;
Daughters, sisters, fishing for beaux,
Want fresh bait — who can oppose,
Or grudge that way the money goes.

A lot of real estate you buy—
To rent your houses out you try—
But spite of all that you can do,
Repairs and taxes eat you through !
At last, and much to your delight,
Your tenant moves away at night;
Where he's gone you can't suppose —
Of course a twelvemonth's rent he owes —
And that's the way the money goes.

And then again the whole-souled boys,
Who will indulge in tavern joys,
And round the bar are daily found,
And bitters and wine and wit go round.
Sangarees and cocktails not a few,
Toddies, and slings, and juleps too;
Champaigne in goblets freely flows,
Till drunk, they stagger home to doze,
And that's the way the money goes.

No wonder money is so scarce,
While market charges are so fierce;
The price of pork brings great distress,
And five-cent loaves grow daily less;
In meat's high price there's no decrease,
In turkeys, fowls, or game, or geese.
How we're to live there's nobody knows,
Or pay for fire to warm our toes —
The devil knows how the money goes.

Second Encore

In summer time the dollars have wings,
The ladies all must see the springs;
Travelling charges, hotel bills,
Steamboats, railroads, and other ills.
In winter, parties and balls abound,
Or in a sleigh you skim the ground.
Stay out all night—though hard it snows, —
Mull'd wine—hot punch, and no repose, —
And that's the way the money goes.

Some folks, in hopes to cut a dash,
In stocks will venture all their cash,
And buy on time — in long and short,
S. O. or B. O— Sold and bought.
When time is up, 'tis you who pay—
Or if you win, your friend's away.
Fall or rise—you're sure to lose,
How 'tis managed nobody knows,
But well you know your money goes.

Then since the times are really bad,
Your spirits will get dull and sad;
To cheer your minds and get delight,
Best crowd the theatre every night.
Care kill'd a cat, and life is short,
Enjoy yourselves in mirth and sport;
Come in hundreds, belles and beaux,
Crowd completely all those rows,
And well I'll say your money goes !
