= Zehava Gal =

- זֶהָבָה גַּל
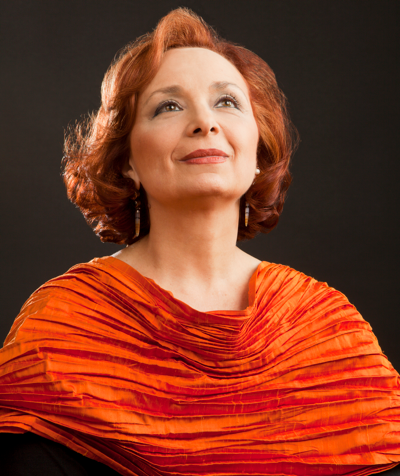
- Occupation: Operatic mezzo-soprano
- Website: www.voicebygal.com/voicebygal.com/BioEnglish.html

Zehava Gal (Hebrew: זֶהָבָה גַּל) is an Israeli-born operatic mezzo-soprano.

Zehava Gal has sung leading roles in both European and North American opera houses and festivals, including La Scala, the Vienna Staatsoper, the Paris Opera, and the Royal Opera House, Covent Garden, as well as at the Salzburg Easter Festival, Glyndebourne Opera Festival, and the Rossini Opera Festival in Pesaro. She also sang the title role in Peter Brook's 1983 film, La Tragedie de Carmen.

Her concert performances include the world premiere of Benjamin Lees' Symphony No. 4, Memorial Candles for mezzo-soprano, violin and orchestra (Dallas Symphony Orchestra, 10 October 1985).

In 1994, she became an adjunct associate professor of voice at Westminster Choir College of Rider University, however as of 2021, she no longer works at the institution.

== Discography ==
Zehava Gal's recordings include:

- Antonio Salieri: Tarare – Recorded at the Schwetzingen Festival, 1988 (DVD). Label: EuroArts-Arthaus Musik
- Rossini: Mosè in Egitto – Claudio Scimone, conductor, 1981 (CD). Label: Decca
- Claudio Abbado Conducts Mussorgsky – London Symphony Orchestra, 1992 (CD). Label: RCA Records
- Gideon Klein: Oeuvres Instrumentales et Vocales, Fabrice Parmentier, conductor, 1994 (CD). Label: Arion
