= Charles-Henri Plantade =

French classical composer and singing professor

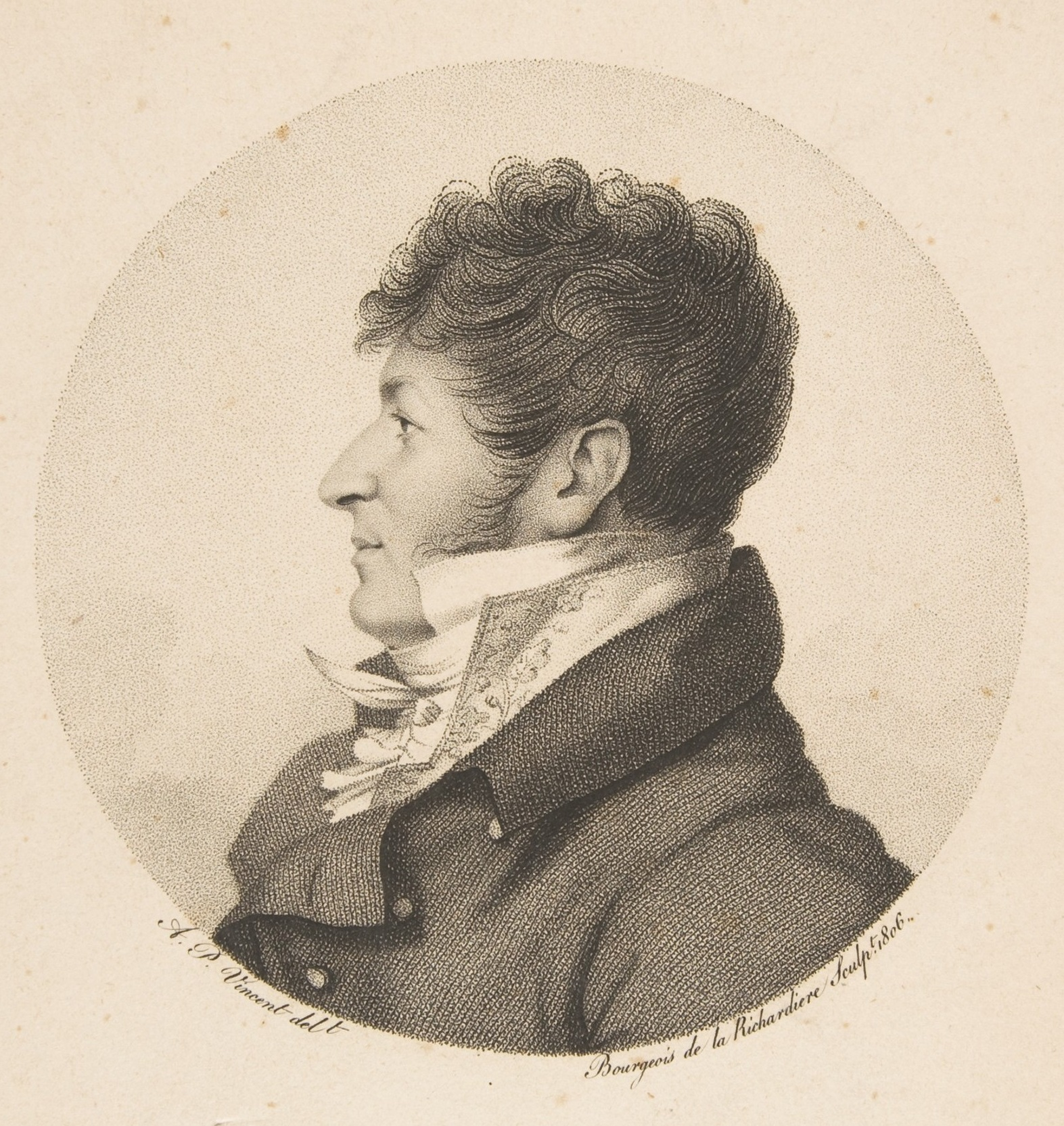
- Plantade in 1806
- Born: 14 October 1764; Pontoise, France
- Died: 18 December 1839 (aged 75); Paris, France
- Occupations: Composer; singing professor
- Relatives: Charles-François Plantade (son)

Charles-Henri Plantade (14 October 1764 – 18 December 1839) was a French classical composer and singing professor. His compositions included several operas, numerous romances, sacred music, and a sonata for harp. He taught singing at the Conservatoire de Paris and was the maître de chapelle to the courts of Louis Bonaparte in Holland and Louis XVIII in France. From 1812 to 1815 he was also the singing master and stage director of the Paris Opéra. Plantade was born in Pontoise and died in Paris at the age of 75. His elder son, Charles-François Plantade, was also a composer.

== Life and career ==
Plantade was born in Pontoise, a suburb of Paris. According to his obituary in Le Ménestrel, he came from a noble family whose origins were in Languedoc. Plantade began his musical training in singing and the cello at the age of eight when he entered the school for pages in the Musique du roi, the King's personal troupe of musicians. He went on to study singing and composition with Honoré Langlé, piano with Nicolas-Joseph Hüllmandel, and the harp with Francesco Petrini.

On completing his studies Plantade became a singing teacher and began publishing collections of romances which brought him to the attention of a wider public. One of those songs, "Te bien aimer ô ma chère Zélie", had an extraordinary success in its day. According to Fétis it sold more than 20,000 copies following its publication in 1791 and remained popular for many years. His early success led to his appointment as singing master at Henriette Campan's newly established school for girls at Saint-Germain-en-Laye.

The first of Plantade's ten operas, Les deux Sœurs, premiered in 1792 at the Théâtre Feydeau. He would continue composing throughout his career in parallel with his duties as a professor of singing and maître de chapelle to the courts of Louis Bonaparte in Holland and Louis XVIII and Charles X in France. Plantade taught singing at the Conservatoire de Paris from 1799 to 1807, 1815 to 1816, and 1818 to 1828. Amongst his students there were the future opera singers Laure Cinti-Damoreau, Zulmé Dabadie, and Augustine Albert. One of his singing pupils at Henriette Campan's school had been Hortense de Beauharnais. When her husband, Louis Bonaparte, became the King of Holland in 1807, he was appointed maître de chapelle to the Dutch court and served in that position until the king's abdication in 1810. From 1812 to 1815 he served as the singing master and stage director of the Paris Opéra, and in 1816 he succeeded Persuis as maître de chapelle to Louis XVIII.

During his time as maître de chapelle at the French court, Plantade largely dedicated himself to composing sacred music, producing masses performed at Saint-Denis and a Te Deum and Salve Regina performed in the Reims Cathedral for the coronation of Charles X in May 1825. He retired definitively from the Conservatoire in 1828 and with the July Revolution of 1830 lost all his royal positions. He retired to Batignolles where his last years were marred by financial difficulties and a grave illness which lasted three years and led to his death in Paris at the age of 75. Plantade's funeral, attended by many of his former pupils and artists of the Paris Opéra, was held at Notre-Dame-de-Lorette in Paris followed by interment in Père-Lachaise cemetery.

Plantade and his wife Marguerite Louise Bataille had two sons, the elder of whom was Charles-François Plantade (1787–1870), a composer and founding member of the Orchestre de la Société des Concerts du Conservatoire.

== Compositions ==
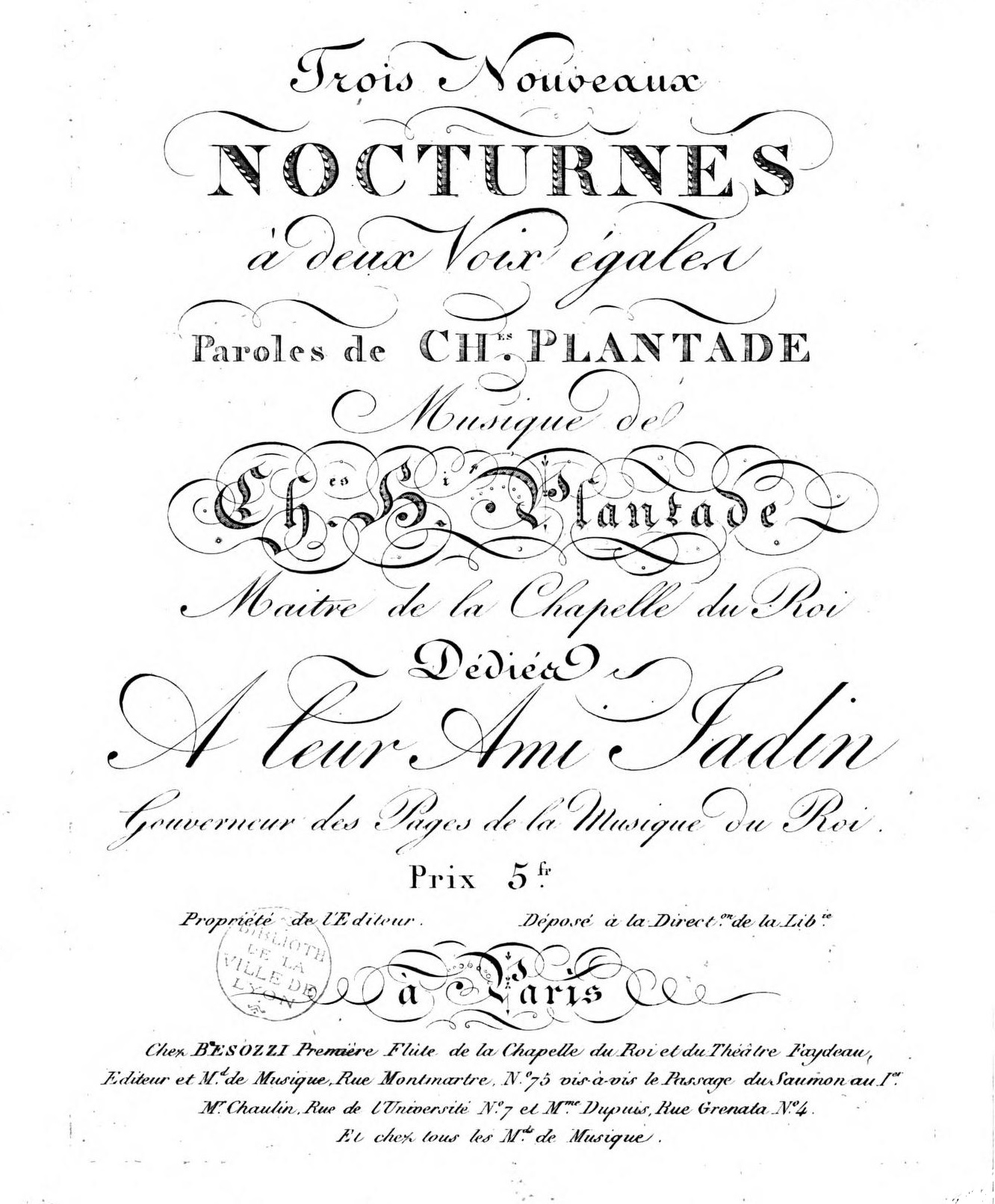
Cover of Plantade's Trois Nouveaux Nocturnes. The words are by his son Charles-François Plantade. Published c. 1820, the work is dedicated to their friend Louis-Emmanuel Jadin.

=== Vocal music ===
Plantade published multiple pieces of secular vocal music—twenty collections of romances for solo voice and three collections of nocturnes for two voices. He also composed Scène lyrique imitée d'Ossian, a cantata based on the Ossian poems, which was performed at the Paris Opéra in 1814 to mark the restoration of Louis XVIII as King of France. The king was so pleased by the work that he awarded Plantade the Légion d'honneur in January 1815.

Plantade's sacred music included five masses, a Te Deum and Salve Regina, several motets and a Requiem performed in 1823 to mark the 30th anniversary of Marie-Antoinette's death. The Requiem was recorded in 2016 by Hervé Niquet and the ensemble Le Concert Spirituel. Niquet described the work as "brimming over with emotion… but also one of ineffable gentleness, unspeakable brutality and respectful sweetness, which left us speechless after the final chords."

=== Operas ===
- Les deux Sœurs (opera in 1 act), libretto by Pierre-Germain Parisau; premiered Paris, Théâtre Feydeau, 22 May 1792
- Les souliers mordorés (opera in 2 acts), libretto by Alexandre de Ferrière; premiered Paris, Théâtre Feydeau, 18 May 1793
- Au plus brave la plus belle (opera in 1 act, mêléé de chants), libretto by Louis Philipon de La Madelaine; premiered Paris, Théâtre des Amis de la Patrie, 5 October 1794
- Palma ou Le voyage en Grèce (opera in 2 acts), libretto by Pierre-Édouard Lémontey, premiered Paris, Théâtre Feydeau, 22 August 1797
- Romagnesi (opera in 1 act), libretto by Pierre-Édouard Lemontey; premiered Paris, Théâtre Feydeau, 3 September 1799
- Zoé ou La pauvre petite (opera in 1 act, mêléé de chants), libretto by Jean-Nicolas Bouilly; premiered Paris, Théâtre Feydeau, 3 July 1800
- Le roman (opera in 1 act), libretto by Étienne Gosse; premiered Paris, Théâtre Feydeau, 12 November 1800
- Lisez Plutarque (opera in 1 act), libretto by Alphonse Martainville; premiered Paris, Théâtre Montansier, October 1800
- Bayard à la ferté ou Le siège de Mézières (opera in 1 act), libretto by Marc-Antoine Madeleine Désaugiers and Michel-Joseph Gentil de Chavagnac; premiered Paris, Théâtre Feydeau, 3 October 1811
- Le mari de circonstance (opera in 1 act), libretto by Eugène de Planard; premiered Paris, Théâtre Feydeau, 18 March 1813
- Blanche de Castille (opera in 1 act), with François-Antoine Habeneck, libretto by Pierre-Ange Vieillard; composed for the Paris Opéra but never performed

== Students ==
Plantade's students at the Conservatoire de Paris included:

- Augustine Albert
- Laure Cinti-Damoreau
- Zulmé Dabadie
- Marie-Julie Halligner
- Jean-François Hennekindt
- Constance Jawureck
- Jean-Étienne-Auguste Massol
