= Laure Cinti-Damoreau =

French soprano (1801–1863)

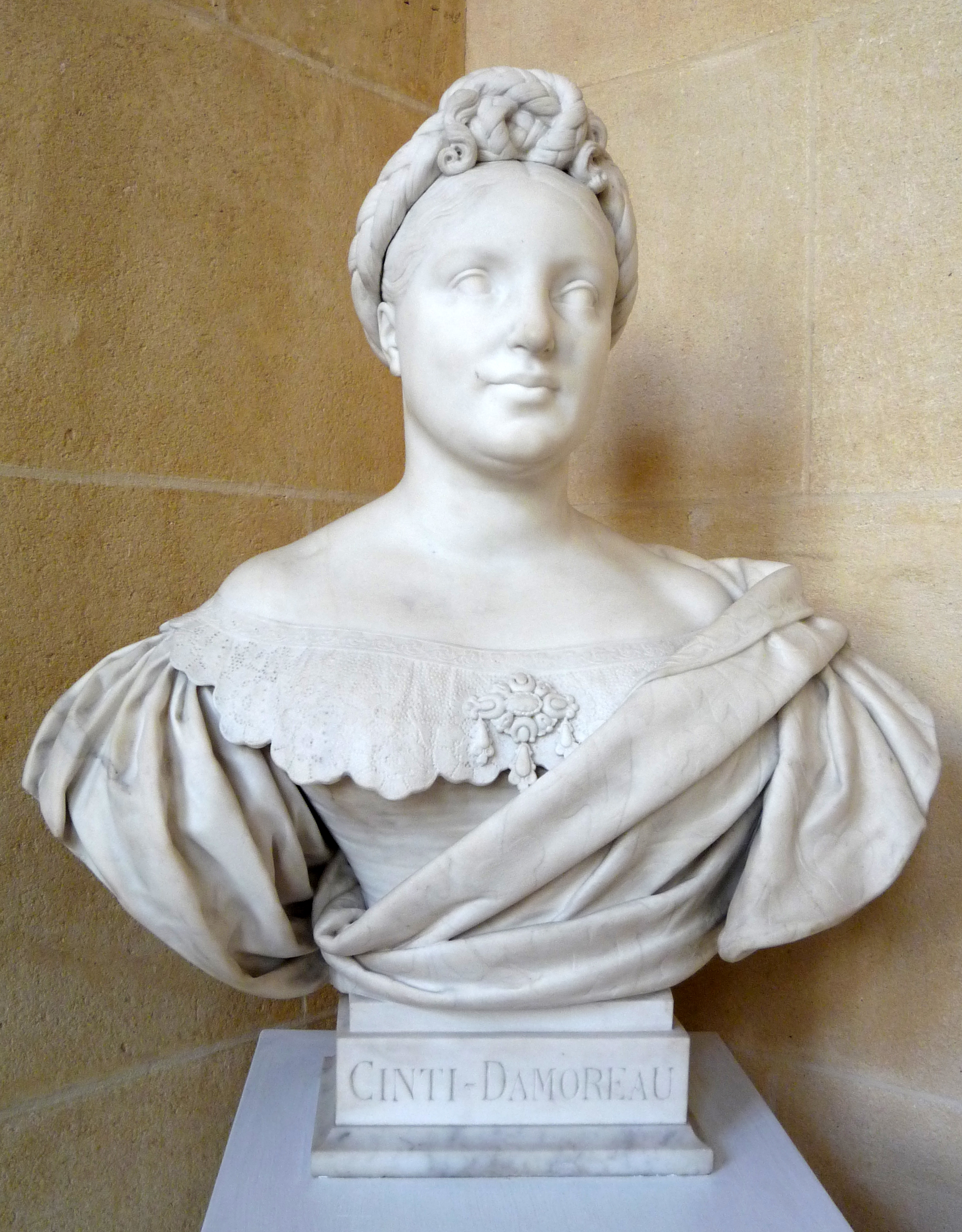
Laure Cinti-Damoreau, 1834 by Louis Desprez (1799-1870) Musée de l'Opéra, Paris

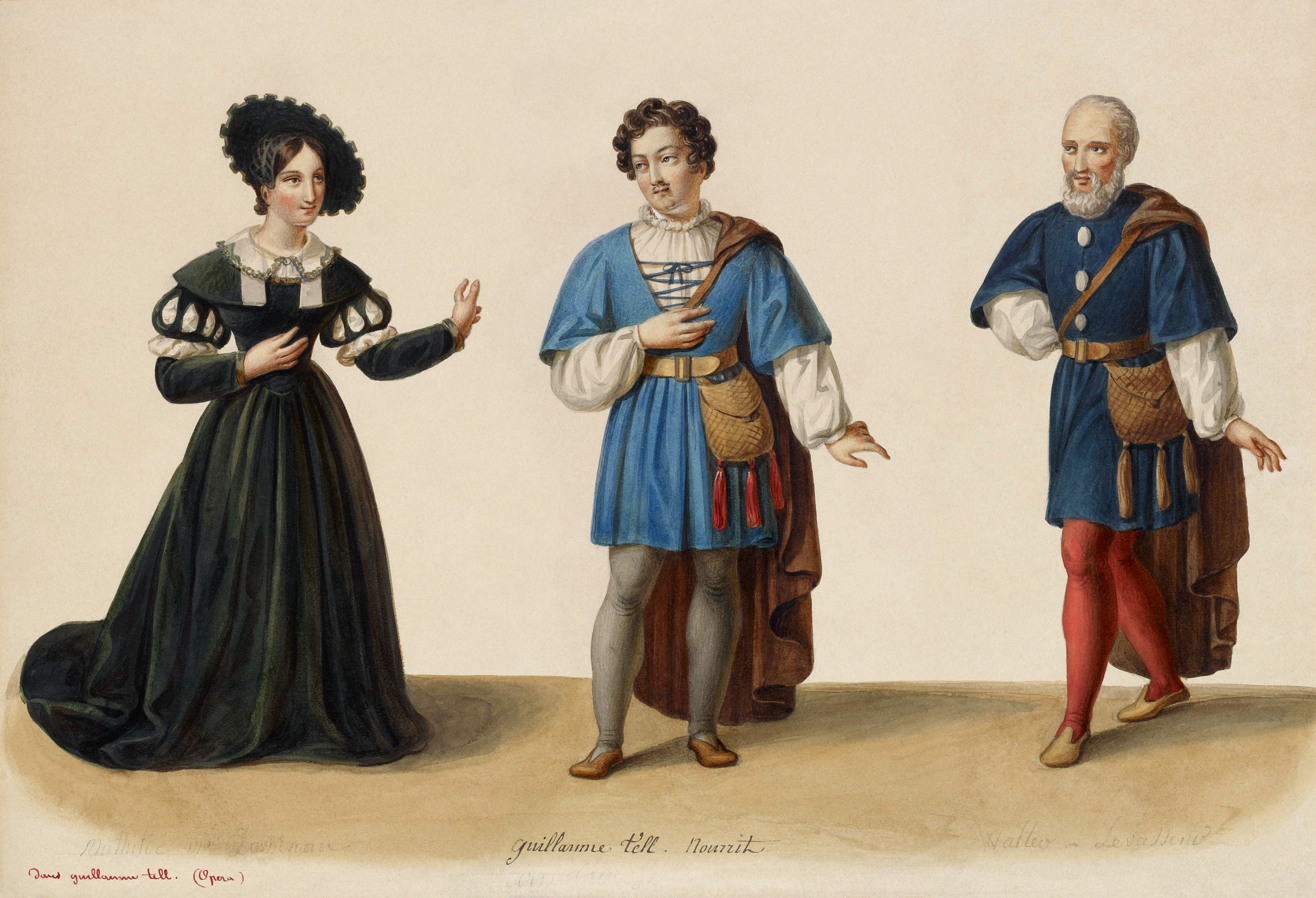
As Mathilde (left) in the original production of Rossini's William Tell.

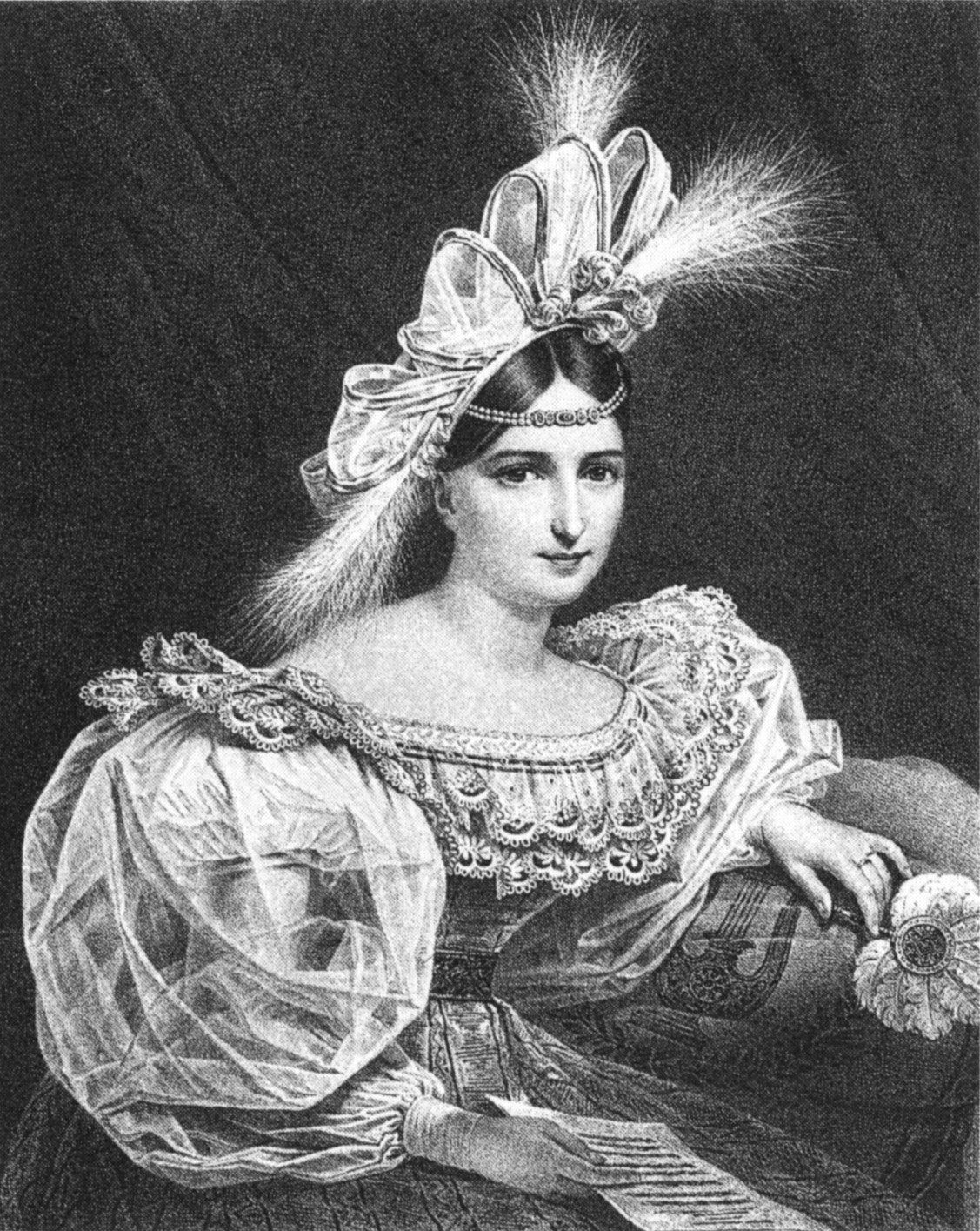
Laure Cinti-Damoreau

Laure Cinti-Damoreau (6 February 1801 – 25 February 1863) was a French soprano particularly associated with Rossini roles.

== Life and career ==
Born Laure-Cinthie Montalant in Paris, she studied in Paris with Charles-Henri Plantade, tenor Giulio Marco Bordogni and soprano Angelica Catalani, who devised her stage name of Cinti by italianizing her middle name and engaged her at the Théâtre-Italien in Paris. There she made her professional debut in Una cosa rara by Vicente Martin y Soler on 8 January 1816. When Catalani's management went bankrupt in 1818, she was reengaged by the new company that had been formed at the Théâtre Louvois, where her roles included Cherubino and Rosina. In 1822 she appeared at the King's Theatre in London. After complementary studies with composer Gioachino Rossini, she sang in the Paris premiere of Elisabetta, regina d'Inghilterra and created the role of Countess Folleville in Il viaggio a Reims.

She made her debut at the Paris Opera in 1825 in a benefit performance of Louis-Sébastien Lebrun's Le Rossignol, and was engaged the following year as a member of the theatre's company. At the Opéra she became the leading lady in Rossini's French productions Moïse et Pharaon, Le Siège de Corinthe, Le Comte Ory, Guillaume Tell, and she also took part in the creation of, notably, Auber's La Muette de Portici and Meyerbeer's Robert le diable. In 1836, when she felt that the rising star of Cornelie Falcon might undermine her leading position at the Opéra, she moved to the Opéra-Comique where she appeared in new operas by Auber (L'Ambassadrice and Le Domino noir). She left the Opéra-Comique in 1841 when Auber broke his promise to entrust her with the leading role in his new opera Les Diamants de la couronne, giving it instead to Anna Thillon, for whom he had a passion. Thereafter she continued to sing in concerts for some years also touring America in 1844.

She taught at the Paris Conservatory from 1833 until 1856, and published a "Méthode de chant" in 1849, still available today as "Classic Bel Canto Technique". She also produced a notable series of "notebooks" where she wrote down in music notation her own embellishments to key sections of many roles and arias she performed. These notebooks are currently kept at the Lilly Library (Indiana University) and are a major primary source for the study of bel-canto performance practice and Rossini scholarship.

She was married to tenor Vincent-Charles Damoreau (1793–1863) from 1828 until 1834, with whom she had a daughter, Maria Cinti-Damoreau, also a soprano, who married the librarian and composer Jean-Baptiste Weckerlin.

She died in Chantilly.

== Bibliography ==
- Giorgio Appolonia: Le voci di Rossini (Torino: EDA, 1992), pp. 300–309.
- Harold Rosenthal and John Warrack (French edition by Roland Mancini and Jean-Jacques Rouveroux): Guide de l'opéra (Paris: Fayard, 1995); ISBN 2-213-59567-4
- Philip Robinson: "Cinti-Damoreau [née Montalant], Laure (Cinthie)", in Laura Macy (ed.): The Grove Book of Opera Singers (New York: Oxford University Press, 2008), pp. 88–89.
- Lilly Library Manuscript Collections
