= Charles-François Plantade =

French composer

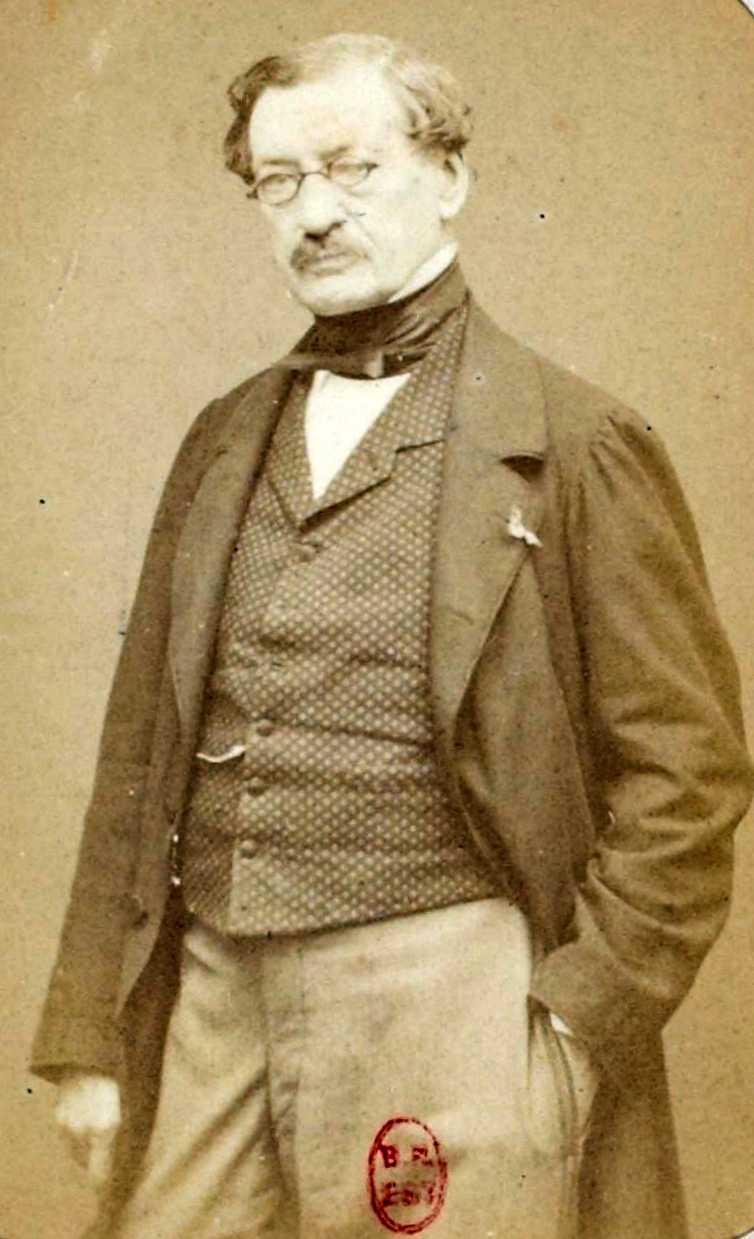
- Born: 17 April 1787; Paris
- Died: 26 May 1870 (aged 83); Paris
- Occupation: Composer

Charles-François Plantade (14 April 1787 – 26 May 1870) was a 19th-century French composer.

== Biography ==
The son of the composer and harpsichordist Charles-Henri Plantade (1764–1839), he was a founding member of the Orchestre de la Société des Concerts du Conservatoire (1828) and of the Société des auteurs, compositeurs et éditeurs de musique (SACEM) (1858). He also held various positions in connection with music in the administration.

== Sources ==
- Erik Kocevar: "Charles-Henri Plantade", in Joël-Marie Fauquet (ed.): Dictionnaire de la musique en France au XIXe siècle (Paris: Fayard, 2003), ISBN 2-213-59316-7.
