= Henri-Bernard Dabadie =

French opera singer

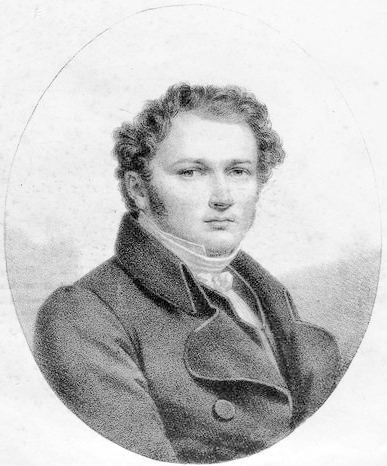
Henri-Bernard Dabadie

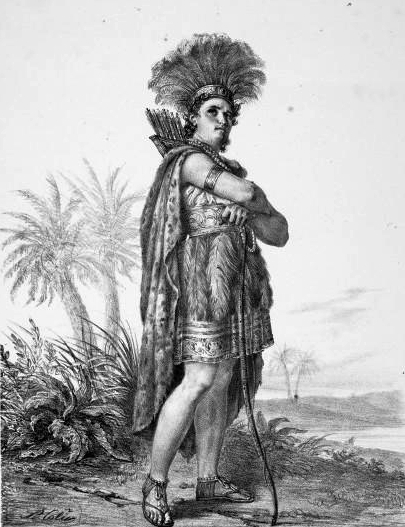
Henri-Bernard Dabadie as Telasco in Gaspare Spontini's Fernand Cortez

Henri-Bernard Dabadie (19 January 1797 – 20 May 1853) was a French baritone, particularly associated with Rossini and Auber roles.

== Life and career ==
Born in Pau, Dabadie studied at the Paris Conservatory and made his debut at the Paris Opéra in 1819 as Cinna in Spontini's La Vestale.

He was to remain at the Opéra until 1836, creating roles specifically written for him by Rossini – notably the Pharaon in Moïse et Pharaon, Raimbaud in Le comte Ory, and Guillaume Tell. He also created roles in opera by Auber – Pietro in La muette de Portici, Jolicoeur in Le Philtre, and Jean in Le Serment.

He also sang in Italy, where he created Belcore in Donizetti's L'elisir d'amore, in Milan on 12 May 1832.

On 6 November 1821, Dabadie married soprano Zulmée Leroux (1795–1877), who began using her married name Dabadie, when she sang at the Paris Opera, where she created the role of Sinaide in Moise and Jemmy in Guillaume Tell.

== Bibliography ==
- Mancini, Roland and Jean-Jacques Rouveroux (orig. H. Rosenthal and J. Warrack, French edition) (eds): Guide de l'opéra (Paris: Fayard, 1995); ISBN 2-213-59567-4
- Tamvaco, Jean-Louis (2000). "Dabadie / Leroux [les]", pp. 919–921, in Les Cancans de l'Opéra: Chroniques de l'Académie Royale de Musique et du théâtre, à Paris sous les deux Restaurations. CNRS. 1307 pages. OCLC 1063925895. ISBN 2271057426.
- Warrack, John; West, Ewan (1992). The Oxford Dictionary of Opera. Oxford: Oxford University Press. ISBN 9780198691648.
