= Joseph Felix von Kurz =

Austrian actor (1717–1784)

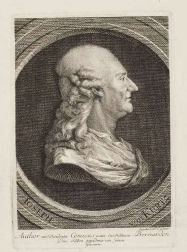
Engraving of Kurz by Ferdinand Landerer, 1763–1795, Herzog Anton Ulrich-Museum

Johann Joseph Felix von Kurz (22 February 1717 – 3 February 1784) was an Austrian actor, playwright and impresario. He achieved fame for his exceptional acting skills, particularly for his recurring role as Bernardon and the so-called 'Bernardoniade', a form of improvisational comedy. Alongside Josef Anton Stranitzky and Gottfried Prehauser, he is considered one of the most important and popular Viennese comedians and actors of the 18th century. His comedies are regarded as the pinnacle of Viennese improvisational theatre.

== Life ==
He was born in Vienna to Felix and Edmunda (von) Kurz - she was known as "die Felixin" while Felix (known as 'Comicus Felix') was a traveling theatre director and actor, originally from Kempten (Allgäu). Johann's godparents were Josef Anton Stranitzky, inventor of Hanswurst (a stock character type) and impresario of the Kärntnertortheater, and Johann Baptist Hilverding, another comedian. Felix left Vienna in 1720, acted in Königsberg and from 1724 onwards was in Breslau (now Wrocław). He founded his own travelling theatre troupe in 1725, which from then until 1730 performed as the "Brünn Comedians" in Brno in the winter and travelled for the rest of the year to Moravia, Munich and Vienna, along with Olomouc in 1726, Breslau in 1731 and Prague in 1734 and 1735. Johann played child roles in his father's company until 1737.

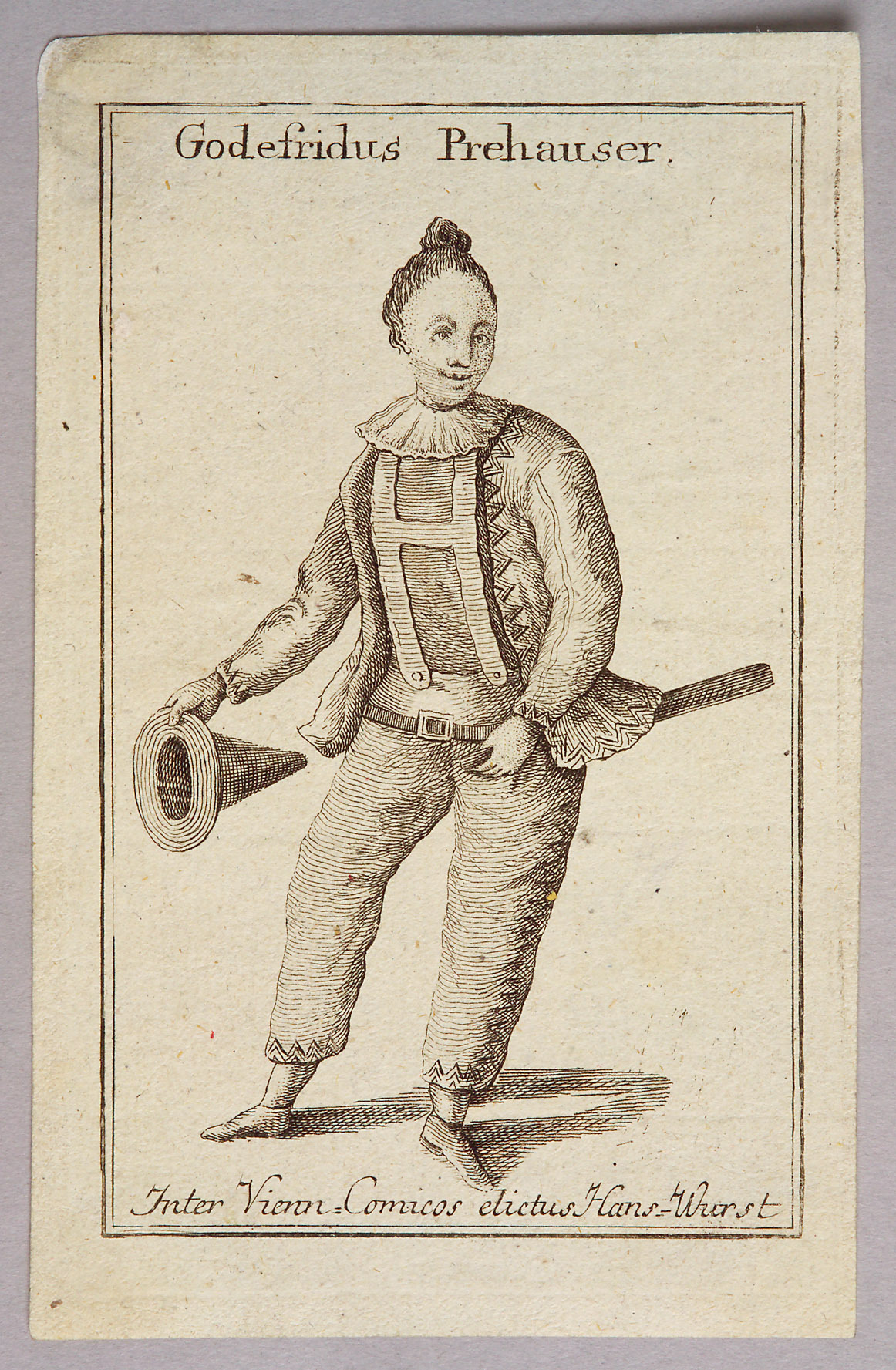
Gottfried Prehauser as Hanswurst

In 1737, Kurz returned to Vienna and became an actor at the Kärntnertor Theatre, where he performed alongside Gottfried Prehauser, Stranitzky's successor as the new Viennese Hanswurst, and Franz Anton Nuth, as Harlequin, and was kept on until 1740. Initially, he played the latter comic role, but during this period he also developed his recurring role of Bernardon, which later became the focus of his comedies and whose name became Kurz's stage name.

The Holy Roman Emperor died in 1740 and theatres were banned. The following year Kurz and the Nuth couple went to Frankfurt and became part of Gerwaldi von Wallerotty's theatre troupe. Through his work with Wallerotty and simultaneously touring with a troupe under French director Jean Baptiste Gherardi, Kurz received important inspiration for the scenarios and plays he wrote later in life. The latter brought him into contact with the French variants of comic traveling theatre, which were more strongly oriented towards the Commedia dell'arte, whilst the latter made him familiar with Wallerotty's theatrical compositions. Wallerotty arranged his performances based on scenarios adapted from existing models, combined with interludes, dance, song, machinery, and fireworks, leaving ample room for improvisation. Kurz's first original plays also date from this period.

In 1742 Kurz left Frankfurt and the following year he performed in Dresden with his father. There he met Franziska Toscani, whom he married on 29 August 1743. She began performing with her husband in 1744. The couple had eight children, who appeared in children's roles in their father's plays. The three eldest, Anna Eleonora Theresia Franziska (born 1745), Bartholomäus Chrystophorus Josephus (born 1746), and Susanna Franziska Antonia (born 1747), were listed by name in the theatre's scripts and payroll.

From 1744 until the end of the 1752–53 season Kurz again performed in Vienna at the Kärntnertor Theatre, primarily staging his own plays. In 1752, Empress Maria Theresa issued the "Norma" edict as part of her reform policies. As early as 1747 efforts towards reforming Viennese theatre were underway in response to Johann Christoph Gottsched's reforms — his banishment of the Hanswurst (a traditional Austrian clown character) in favour of "regular" drama (i.e. scripted not improvised and without comic characters and their crude jokes). The decree was issued on 17 February 1752 and explicitly targeted improvisational comedy as developed by Kurz - its addendum even stated that "all compositions by the so-called Bernardon [...] were banned for all time". Kurz 'fled' after this "ban", performing in Prague in 1753 and in Regensburg during the winter of 1753/1754. He returned to the Kärntnertor Theatre in 1754. Maria Theresa's decree had initially had little impact on theatres. The "Bernardoniads" were too popular even in aristocratic circles and Maria Theresa's husband Franz Stephan of Lorraine, remained a patron of improvisational theatre.

The peak of the popularity of Kurz's "Bernardoniads" and 'machine-comedies' at the Kärntnertortheater came between 1754 and 1760 Most of his surviving plays are from this period, considered his artistic heyday. He collaborated with Joseph Haydn in 1751 and again in 1758 – that composer produced music for Der krumme Teufel, though the score for it is now lost. Kurz's wife Franziska died on 14 July 1755 and on 15 April 1758 he married Theresina Morelli, an actress and dancer – she later played Rosalba, a role specifically written for her, alongside her husband as Bernardon.

From 1760 to 1764 Kurz was director of Prague's Theater an der Kotzen. In winter 1763-64 he made a guest appearance in Venice, before sporadically appearing in Prague, then in Pressburg and Nürnberg. He was then invited to Munich in 1765 and for a year directed the Residenztheater. In summer and autumn 1766 he made a guest appearance in Nürnberg before spending the following years appearing in Mainz, Frankfurt, Mannheim and Cologne. He separated from his wife in 1768 and she took over direction of her own theatre troupe. They reconciled and then tried to re-establish themselves in Vienna, with Kurz briefly serving as the director of the Kärntnertortheater.

From the 1760s onwards the decades-long 'Hanswurst dispute' was mainly waged in the press, but it also led to gradual reform of 'folk comedy'. Over the course of the dispute the theatrical ecosystem in Vienna had changed and improvisational comedy had become obsolete after the deaths of the great extemporisers, particularly Gottfried Prehauser and Friedrich Wilhelm Weiskern (1710–1768). Thanks to Joseph von Sonnenfels's 1770 reorganisation of theatre censorship theatre came under state control - not only did scripts for 'regular' dramas have to be passed by the censor before being performed, but censors also came to the performances themselves to ensure the actors complied with the ban on improvisation.

Kurz left Vienna in 1771 to act in Breslau and Danzig and the following year he moved to Warsaw, where he directed acting troupes. Few details survive on his last years, though after his retirement from the stage he is known to have managed the Warsaw Theatre and run a paper mill. He died alone in Vienna in 1784.

== Works ==
In addition to sixty-nine plays which survive, a further twelve works can be attributed to Kurz. However, in some cases only the titles of the pieces and/or the arias for them have been handed down; very few were printed during his lifetime. Besides 'regular' comedies, or those later developed into 'regular' comedies, Kurz also wrote Die Getreue Prinzeßin Pumphia (The Faithful Princess Pumphia), a travesti of the 'Haupt- und Staatsaktion' (Main and State Action, the plays still dominating German travelling theatre at the time), and Der neue krumme Teufel (The New Crooked Devil), an "opera-comique" as the subtitle indicates, even though it mainly consists of dialogue. Der neue krumme Teufel also includes a children's pantomime and an interlude and both plays exhibit the mixing and juxtaposition of elements as a compositional principle characteristic of Kurz's own brand of improvisational comedy.

Kurz achieved fame as an actor and playwright during his own lifetime, primarily through the role of Bernardon and the "Bernardoniade," a subgenre of extemporized magic burlesque. In terms of theatre history, Kurz-Bernardon's 'total theatre' is considered the pinnacle of Viennese improvisational comedy and improvisational performance. The "Bernardoniades" or machine-comedies have been handed down as scenarios with comic arias and songs. The scenarios allow the modern reader to make an approximate reconstruction of the performances, including details such as the stage design, the characters' appearance and sometimes also dialogue or sections of dialogue, along with instructions for improvised performance.

Kurz's plays are mostly structured around the character of Bernardon, his recurring role. Unlike, for example, Hanswurst, the character of Bernardon is not defined by specific attributes, origins, profession, a consistent type or a familiar unchanging costume. Rather, it possesses a transformative ability, versatility, and flexibility - for example, it is not gender-specific. In this respect, the Bernardon figure is characterized by its "wit and delight in fun, deception, and violence", which the figure presents under the pressure of reacting to the circumstances of an uncontrollable world of play. From a dramaturgical perspective, the character functions as a "audience-effective actor", who also establishes a connection between the scenes and episodes within the play. Due to Bernardon's transformative abilities and multiple roles, the character being continually onstage in the same guise does not guarantee the connection between the Bernardon roles. A link between the transformations is established via the same actor, Kurz, or rather, through the identical name of the character.

The “Bernardoniade” is a revue-like composition that remains formally open, stringing together scenes, episodes and transformations without following a logically developed plot, unlike the historically earlier ‘Haupt- und Staatsaktionen’ (main and state actions) which, with their Hanswurst interludes, “arrange themselves logically according to the motifs of love and political intrigue.” A story is replaced by theatrical action. Kurz not only combined different theatrical elements (ballet, pantomime, musical intermezzi, composed songs) but also various formal traditions (singspiel, Commedia dell'arte, elements of Venetian opera, Baroque opera, and Jesuit theatre, such as theatrical machinery, allegory, and the magic frame). He also recombined templates, motifs and setpieces from many varied countries, traditions and languages.

== List of selected works ==
- Türken- und Seeräuber-Ballette (1741)
- Comoedie genannt: Die Geburth des Bernardons (vor 1742)
- Die Judenhochzeit oder Bernardon der betrogene Betrüger. Ein komisches Singspiel in einem Aufzuge (1741)
- Comoedie betitult: Bernardon zu Sanct Marx (= Bernardon im Tollhaus) (um 1742)
- Comoedie betitult: Der ehrliche Filou (1742/43)
- Comoedie betitult: Continuation der Geburth des Bernardons (1742–52)
- Anderte Continuation auf Bernardons Geburth betitult: Der Todt des Bernardons (1742–52)
- Comoedie genannt: Des Hanns-Wurst und Bernardons erschröckliche Weiber- und Buben Pataille. Oder die zum weinen lachende blutige Mord-Tragoedie (1. Fassung) (1744–53)
- Der neue krumme Teufel. Eine Opera-Comique von zwey Aufzügen nebst einer Kinder-Pantomime, betitult: Arlequin, der neue Abgott Ram in America (1751; Druck 1758; Digitalisat)
- Comoedia betitult: Columbina Bernardolin (1752)
- Comoedia genannt: Hanns-Wurst, Hexenmeister aus Liebe oder: Das verhexte Tschihy (1752)
- Der ohne Holz lebendige verbrennte Zauberer Bernardon. Ein Lustspiel in drey Aufzügen (1. Fassung, Druck 1771; Digitalisat)
- Comoedie: Der rasende Zamor (1752)
- Le Diable Marie, oder Pelphegor der verheyrathete Teufel, mit Bernardon dem Ambassadeur in das unterirdische Reich (1752)
- Comoedie genannt: Der Lebens-Lauff des Bernardons (um 1753)
- Comoedie genannt: Der sparsame Bernardon, und dessen narrische Haushaltung, Oder: Bernardon der Katzen-Narr (um 1753)
- Comoedie genannt: Bernardon der dumme Nachfolger des Doctor Faustes (= Die Reise des Bernardons in die Hölle) (um 1753)
- Comoedie genannt: Die Reise des Bernardons aus der Höllen (um 1753)
- Comoedie oder die anderte Continuation des Bernardons Reise in die Hölle; unter dem Titul: Die Reise des Bernardons in sein Vatterland nacher Presburg (um 1753)
- Comoedie genannt: Bernardon, der weynende Amant, und Hanns Wurst der Coupler von des Herodes seiner Frau Mariamne Fürstin von Ierusalem (um 1753)
- Comoedie genannt: Bernardon der schlesische Landedelmann (um 1753)
- Der falsche verdacht. Ein nachspill (= Bernardon, der unschuldige Missethäter) (um 1753)
- Comoedie: Hanns-Wurst und Bernardon, die zwey heldenmüthigen Söhne des großen Ritters Sacrapans, und tapfere Befreyer der Königin Lenorella, auf der Jnsel Lilliput (um 1753)
- Comoedie betitult: Bernardon, der aus einem Schmeltzdegel entsprungene flüchtige Mercurialische Geist, nebst einem Poetischen Prologum genannt: Der Creut-weis mit Fesseln belegte Cupido. Oder der Streit zwischen denen Göttern und Gottinnen über den unschuldig verklagten Bernardonischen Mercurium (um 1753)
- Comoedie genannt: Der in Anfang gescheide, in der Mitte narrische, und am Ende wieder gescheide Bernardon, Oder der tyrannische Murat, König von Tripolis (um 1753)
- Comoedie genannt: Der achtmahl verwandelte Bernardon, und Hannß-Wurst der gezwungene Holz-Hacker (um 1753)
- Comoedie betitult: Der narrisch-eifersüchtige Bernardon (um 1753)
- Bernardon der 30 iährige A, b, c Schütz: oder Hanswurst der reiche Baur und Pantalon der arme Edelmann (und Colombina, die glücklich gewordene Haubenheffterin) (1753)
- Comoedie: Der aufs neue begeisterte und belebte Bernardon, Nebst zweyen Pantomimischen Kinder-Balletten, Unter dem Titul: Der Erste Der Durch Magische Kraft und durch Würkung der Göttin Lachasis wieder aufs neue belebte Bernardon. Der Anderte Das wankelmüthige Frauenzimmer, Oder La fille Coquette (1754)
- Comoedie genannt: Bernardon auf der Gelsen-Insul Oder die Spatzen-Zauberey mit der lustigen Regens Chori Pantomime (1754)
- Lustspiel: Der Windmacher (1754)
- Eine neue Tragödie, betitult: Bernardon die getreue Prinzeßin Pumphia, und Hanns-Wurst der tyrannische Tartar-Kulikan. Eine Parodie in lächerlichen Versen. Nebst einer Kinder-Pantomime, betitult: Arleckin, der glücklich gewordene Bräutigam (1755, Druck 1756; Digitalisat)
- Bernardon im Serail (= Der Derwisch) (1755)
- Die drey verheyrateten Lehn-Laquais, oder: Die verlohrne Wette des Bernardons mit Fiametta, der lächerlichen Schildwacht nach der neusten Mode (1755)
- Comoedie genannt: Die drey und dreyßig Schelmereyen des Bernardons, welche theils durch ihn, theils aber durch seine Anstiftung von seinem Bruder Lucrino, aufgeführet werden (um 1755)
- Der sich wider seinen Willen taub und stumm stellende Liebhaber. Ein Lustspiel, von zwey Aufzügen, in Teutschen Versen mit vierzehen Arien, welche von den Bernardonischen Kindern vorgestellet und in Teutscher Sprache hier noch niemals aufgeführet worden ist (1755)
- Comoedie: Das zerstöhrte Versprechen des Bernardons, In welchen auch eine Kinder-Pantomime von Zwergen, nebst der Poesie, und anderen Vorstellungen zu sehen sind (1754–1758)
- Comoedie: Bernardon der Einsiedler, und dessen unglückseelige Bemühung seine Braut bey der Göttin Diana zu sehen. Operetta: Ormechus, ein tyrannischer Neben-Buhler seines Sohns Cosroe. Pantomime: Bernardons Traum in der Wüsteney (um 1757)
- Neue Comoedie genannt: Die Macht der Elementen, oder: Die versoffene Familie des Herrn Baron von Kühnstoks. Prologus: Der zum Leben gebrachte Stein. Operetta: Die das Glücke hat, führt den Bräutigam nach Hause. Pantomime: Die liederliche Haushaltung versoffener Köche und verlöffelter Stuhenmenscher (1757/58)
- Comoedie: Die glückliche Verbindung des Bernardons, nebst einer Kinder-Pantomime, betitult: Bernardons glücklicher Traum (1758)
- Comoedie betitult: Bernardons Ehestand, nebst einer pantomimischen Vorstellung (Der sich niemals begnügende Schäfer Coridon) und einem Lustspiel von denen Bernardonischen Kindern (Was für Narrheit kann nicht die Eifersucht anstellen) (um 1758)
- Neue Comoedie: Die von Minerva beschützte Unschuld, Oder die Vereinigung derer Liebesgötter (um 1758)
- Comoedie betitult: Der vermeinte Mörder seiner selbst eigenen Persohn (um 1758)
- Comoedie: Das Verhexte Tschihy, Oder Hanns-Wurst, der Hexen-Meister aus Liebe (um 1758)
- Comoedie genannt: Colombina Maga (um 1758)
- Comoedie betitult: Das besessene Haus des Pantalon (um 1758)
- Bernardon und Bernardina, die zwey Gleichen in zweyerley Geschlechtern, Oder die geraubten und zuletzt glücklich gewordenen Zwilling (nach 1758)
- Der erschröckliche, entsetzliche und mit vielen Blut vergossene Weiber und Buben Bataille des Bernardons und Hanns-Wursts (2. Fassung, nach 1758)
- Das europäische Wäschermädel mit Bernardon, dem hoffärtigen Bauernrichters-Sohn und lebendig begrabenen Bräutigam. Oder: der getreue Jakerl und die beständige Klumperl, Sonst genannt: Die verliebte Probe des Mehmets Bassa von Algier. (nach 1758)
- Comoedie: Die fünf kleinen Luft-Geister, oder: Die wunderlichen Reisen des Hanns-Wursts und Bernardons nacher Ungarn, Italien, Holland, Spanien, Türkey und Frankreich (1758–1760)
- Comoedie: Bernardon die versoffene Gouvernante (1760–1763)
- Comoedie: Das Leben und Tod der zaubernden Circe (1760)
- Neue Comoedie: Der adeliche Cammer-Diener und die verliebte Widerspenstige in der Trauer. Oder: Der Streit zwischen Rache, Liebe und hoher Geburt (1760)
- Bernardon der beängstigte Impressarius oder: Die fehlgeschlagene Probe (1763/64)
- Neues Lustspiel: Die Insul der gesunden Vernunft. Wobey Fiametta und Bernardon das Wunderwerk einer ungekünstelten Natur vorstellen. Mit Hannswurst dem sich dreymal verstellenden Grafen von Gerstenschleim (1764)
- Comoedie: Der vergötterte Bernardon (= Die Probe wahrer Beständigkeit) (1764)
- Die Judenhochzeit oder Bernardon der betrogene Betrüger (Singspielfassung) (um 1766)
- Le mercure Galante, oder Der in die Feder verwandelte Degen. Mit Odoardo, dem unwissenden Nebenbuhler seines Sohnes, und Bernardon dem Camelion in sechserley Gestalt (um 1766)
- Das in dem Gefilde der Freude frohlockende Teutschland (1767)
- La Serva Pardona. Die Dienerin eine Frau, oder die vier ungleichen Heurathen, ein neues Lustspiel mit 17 von zweyen Abtheilungen in Versen, Arietten und Duetten, nebst einem Chorus, aus einem italiänischen Intermezzo gezogen (1768; Digitalisat)
- Die frohlockenden Schäfer. Ein Musicalisches Vorspiel in einem Aufzuge (1768)
- Der unruhige Reichtum. Ein Lustspiel in drey Aufzügen (1770; Digitalisat)
- Pantomimisches Singspiel: Die Herrschaftskuchel auf dem Lande, mit Bernardon dem dicken Mundkoch, Oder: Die versoffenen Köche und die verliebten Stubenmädel (1770; Digitalisat)
- Die Insul der Wilden oder die wankelmütige Insulanerin mit Arlequin dem durch einen Zauberer zum Abgott Ram gemachten König von der Insul Tschaleley (1770)

=== Critical editions ===
- Johann Joseph Felix von Kurz: Eine ganz neue Komödie … Ausgewählte Bernardoniaden und Lustspiele (= Texte und Studien zur österreichischen Literatur- und Theatergeschichte. Vol. 3). Herausgegeben von Andrea Brandner-Kapfer. Lehner, Vienna 2010, ISBN 978-3-901749-79-7.
- Andrea Brandner-Kapfer: Johann Joseph Felix von Kurz: Das Komödienwerk. (Historisch-Kritische Edition). Graz 2007 (Graz, university, Dissertation, 2007).
- Teutsche Arien, Welche auf dem Kayserlich-privilegirten Wienerischen Theatro in unterschiedlich producirten Comoedien, deren Titul hier jedesmahl beygedrucket, gesungen worden. Cod. Ms. 12706–12709 der Wiener Nationalbibliothek (= Museion. Veröffentlichungen aus der Nationalbibliothek in Wien. Erstausgaben und Neudrucke. Vol. 2, ZDB-ID 251503-9). Mit Einleitung und Anmerkungen herausgegeben von Max Pirker. 2 Bände. Strache, Vienna u. a. 1927–1929.
- Otto Rommel (ed.): Die Maschinenkomödie (= Deutsche Literatur. Sammlung literarischer Kunst- und Kulturdenkmäler in Entwicklungsreihen. 13: Barock. D: Barocktradition im österreichisch-bayrischen Volkstheater. Vol. 1, ZDB-ID 1171428-1). Reclam. Leipzig 1935.
- Joseph Anton Stranitzky: Hanswurstiaden. Ein Jahrhundert Wiener Komödie. Edited by and with an afterword by Johann Sonnleitner. Residenz-Verlag, Salzburg etc. 1996, ISBN 3-7017-1028-7.

== Bibliography (in Germany) ==
- Ulf Birbaumer: Das Werk des Joseph Felix von Kurz-Bernardon und seine szenische Realisierung. Versuch einer Genealogie und Dramaturgie der Bernardoniade (= Dissertationen der Universität Wien. Bd. 47, 1–2, ISSN 0379-1424). 2 Bände. Verlag Notring, Vienna 1971 (Vienna, university, Dissertation, 1969).
- Maria Laura Ferrari: Zwischen Jahrmarkt und Akademie. Kurz-Bernardon und die Reform des deutschen Theaters im 18. Jahrhundert. Übersetzt von Ingrid Eyer. In: Jahrbuch des Wiener Goethe-Vereins. Bd. 92/93, 1988/1989, ISSN 0250-443X, p. 193–208.
- Hilde Haider-Pregler: Der wienerische Weg zur K.K.-Hof- und Nationalschaubühne. In: Roger Bauer, Jürgen Wertheimer (ed.): Das Ende des Stegreifspiels – Die Geburt des Nationaltheaters. Ein Wendepunkt in der Geschichte des europäischen Dramas. Fink, Munich 1983, ISBN 3-7705-2008-4, pp. 24–37.
- Hilde Haider-Pregler: Des sittlichen Bürgers Abendschule. Bildungsanspruch und Bildungsauftrag des Berufstheaters im 18. Jahrhundert. Jugend u. Volk, Wien u. a. 1980, ISBN 3-7141-6552-5.
- Joseph Kürschner (1883). "Kurz, Joseph Felix" . Allgemeine Deutsche Biographie (in German). Vol. 17. Leipzig: Duncker & Humblot. pp. 426–428.
- Anna Hilda Matzner: Überprüfung der Materialien zur Biographie des Josef Felix v. Kurz. Vienna 1937 (Vienna, university, phil. Dissertation, 1937, (maschinschriftlich)).
- Karl Goedeke, Edmund Goetze: Grundriss zur Geschichte der deutschen Dichtung aus den Quellen. 2nd edn.. Ehlermann, Leipzig 1893, Vol. 5. p. 303–308.
- Beatrix Müller-Kampel: Hanswurst, Bernardon, Kasperl. Spaßtheater im 18. Jahrhundert. Schöningh, Paderborn u. a. 2003, ISBN 3-506-75812-8 (Digitalisat).
- Beatrix Müller-Kampel: Verboten, vertrieben, vergessen. Das totale Theater des Joseph Felix von Kurz am Beispiel der Bernardoniade „Die fünf kleinen Luft-Geister“. In: Edward Białek, Manfred Durzak, Marek Zybura (ed.): Literatur im Zeugenstand. Beiträge zur deutschsprachigen Literatur- und Kulturgeschichte. Festschrift für Hubert Orłowski (= Oppelner Beiträge zur Germanistik. Band 5). Lang, Frankfurt am Main u. a. 2002, ISBN 3-631-39495-0, p. 453–496.
- Ferdinand Raab: Johann Joseph Felix von Kurz genannt Bernardon. Ein Beitrag zur Geschichte des deutschen Theaters im XVIII. Jahrhundert. Aus dem Nachlaß herausgegeben von Fritz Raab. Rütten & Loening, Frankfurt am Main 1899, (Digitalisat).
- Josef Wolfgang Rademaker: "Johann Joseph Felix von Kurz, gen. Bernardon – Reisender der Hölle, Mainz 1999 (Mainz, Johannes Gutenberg-Universität, phil. Dissertation, 1999)
- Otto Rommel: Die Alt-Wiener Volkskomödie. Ihre Geschichte vom barocken Welt-Theater bis zum Tode Nestroys. Schroll, Vienna 1952.
- Gertraude Wilhelm (1982). "Kurz, Joseph Felix". Neue Deutsche Biographie (in German). Vol. 13. Berlin: Duncker & Humblot. pp. 335–336. (full text online).
- Constantin von Wurzbach: "Bernardon (von Kurz, Felix)." In: Biographisches Lexikon des Kaiserthums Oesterreich (Biographical Lexicon of the Empire of Austria). Part 1 Universitäts-Buchdruckerei L. C. Zamarski (formerly J. P. Sollinger), Vienna 1856, p. 324 f. (digitalised).
