= The Lame Devil =

The Lame Devil (from French: le diable boiteux) may refer to:

As a work

- The Lame Devil (novel) one translation of the 1707 novel by Alain-René Lesage
- The Lame Devil (film), one translation of the 1948 film by Sacha Guitry
- El diablo cojuelo (tr. "The Lame Devil"), a 1641 satire by Luis Vélez de Guevara
- Der krumme Teufel (tr. "The Lame Devil"), the 1751 debut opera by Haydn
- "Lame Devil", one of Italo Calvino's 1956 Italian Folktales

As a historical nickname

- Asmodeus, a demon king
- Talleyrand (1754–1838), French diplomat
- Eliaser Bamberg (1760-1833), Dutch stage magician
- Lord Byron (1788–1824), English poet

== See also ==
- Le Diable boiteux (disambiguation), items under the original French title
