= Le Diable boiteux =

Le Diable boiteux (French for The Lame Devil) may refer to:

As a French work

- Le Diable boiteux (novel), 1707 novel by Alain-René Lesage
- Le Diable boiteux (play), 1707 comedy by Florent Carton Dancourt
- Le Diable boiteux (opera), 1782 opéra comique by Charles Nicolas Favart
- Le Diable boiteux (ballet), 1836 ballet by Jean Coralli
- Le Diable boiteux (film), 1948 film by Sacha Guitry

As a historical nickname

- Asmodeus, a demon king
- Talleyrand (1754–1838), French diplomat
- Eliaser Bamberg (1760–1833), Dutch stage magician
- Lord Byron (1788–1824), English poet

== See also ==
- The Lame Devil (disambiguation), items under the translated English title
