= La Cucaracha =

Spanish/Mexican traditional folk song

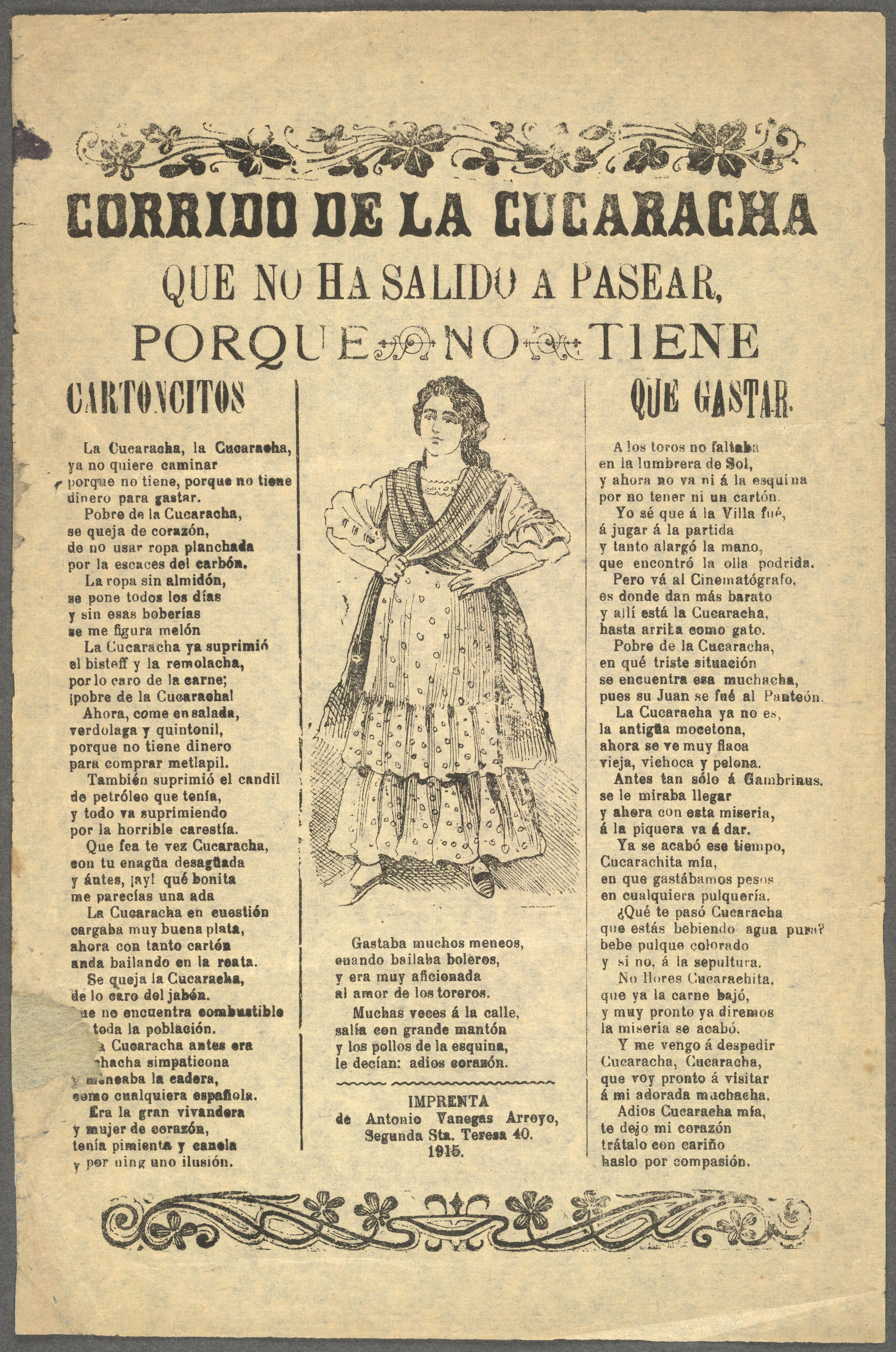
"Corrido de la Cucaracha", lithograph (published in 1915) by Antonio Vanegas Arroyo

"La Cucaracha" (Spanish pronunciation: [la kukaˈɾatʃa], "The Cockroach") is a popular folk song about a cockroach that cannot walk. The song's origins are Spanish, but it became popular in the 1910s during the Mexican Revolution. The modern song has been adapted using the Mexican corrido genre. The song's melody is widely known and there are many alternative stanzas.

== Structure ==
The song consists of verse-and-refrain (strophe-antistrophe) pairs, with each half of each pair consisting of four lines featuring an ABCB rhyme scheme.

=== Refrain ===
"La Cucaracha" (chorus)

The song's earliest lyrics, from which its name is derived, concern a cockroach that has lost two of its six legs and struggles to walk with the remaining four.

La cu-ca- | ra-cha, la cu-ca-ra-cha
| ya no pue-de ca-mi-nar
por-que no | tie-ne, por-que le fal-tan
| las dos pa-titas de a-trás. (Note: There are many versions of this line; the most common ones include una pata par' [para] andar ("a leg to walk [on]"), la patita principal ("the front leg"), patas para caminar ("legs for walking"), and (las) la pata de atrás ("[the] two back feet"). Versions mentioning specific numbers of legs are associated with a children's game and counting song in which participants pull the legs off a captured cockroach, singing the stanza once per leg and removing the leg as the number (increasing by one per stanza) is sung. Other versions discard any mention of the cockroach's missing leg(s), substituting unrelated material (e.g., Marihuana pa' fumar of the well-known anti-Huerta version).)

("The cockroach, the cockroach / can no longer walk / because she doesn't have, because she lacks / the two hind legs to walk"; these lyrics form the basis for the refrain of most later versions. Syllables having primary stress are in boldface; syllables having secondary stress are in roman type; unstressed syllables are in italics. Measure divisions are independent of text line breaks and are indicated by vertical bar lines; note that the refrain begins with an anacrusis/"pickup.")

Many later versions of the song, especially those whose lyrics do not mention the cockroach's missing leg(s), extend the last syllable of each line to fit the more familiar 6/4 meter. Almost all modern versions, however, use a 4/4 meter instead with a clave rhythm to give the feeling of three pulses.

=== Verses ===
The song's verses fit a traditional melody separate from that of the refrain but sharing the refrain's meter (either 5/4, 6/4, or 4/4 clave as discussed above). In other respects, they are highly variable, usually providing satirical commentary on contemporary political or social problems or disputes.

=== Melody ===
Source

== Historical evolution ==
The origins of "La Cucaracha" are obscure. The lyrics of the refrain make no explicit reference to historical events, so it is difficult, if not impossible, to date them. However, because the verses are improvised according to the needs of the time, and mention contemporary social or political conditions, a rough estimate of their age can be made.

=== Pre-Revolution lyrics ===
Several early (pre-Revolution) sets of lyrics exist, referring to historical events.

In his book Cantos Populares Españoles (1883), Francisco Rodríguez Marín notes lyrics referring to the then recent Hispano-Moroccan War (1859–1860), which were probably developed by the troops during the campaign to boost their morale, using an existing melody:

Spanish

De las patillas de un moro
tengo que hacer una escoba,
para barrer el cuartel
de la infantería española.

Translation:

From the sideburns of a Moor
I must make a broom,
to sweep the quarters
of the Spanish infantry.

Some early versions of the lyrics refer to the confrontation between Spanish and Moroccan troops (popularly referred to as "Moors" by the Spanish) during the Hispano-Moroccan War, that reflect Spanish popular imagery during their development from 1859 to 1860.

One of the earliest written references to the song appears in the 1819 novel La Quijotita y su Prima, by Mexican writer and political journalist José Joaquín Fernández de Lizardi, in which it is suggested that:

Spanish

Un capitán de marina
que vino en una fragata
entre varios sonecitos
trajo el de "La Cucaracha".

Translation:

A naval captain
who came in a frigate
among various tunes
brought the one about "La Cucaracha".

Other early stanzas concern events such as the Carlist Wars (1833–1876) in Spain, and the French intervention in Mexico (1861).

The period of the Mexican Revolution, from 1910 to about 1920, saw the first major period of verse production for "La Cucaracha", because both rebel and government forces invented political lyrics for the song. Many stanzas were added during that period, today associated mostly with Mexico.

=== Revolutionary lyrics ===
The Mexican Revolution was a period of great political upheaval, during which the majority of the stanzas known today were written. Political symbolism was a common theme in those verses, and explicit and implicit references were made to events of the conflict, major political figures, and the effects of the war on the civilians in general. Today, few pre-Revolution verses are known, and the most commonly quoted portion of the song are the two Villista anti-Huerta stanzas:

Spanish

La cucaracha, la cucaracha,
ya no puede caminar
porque no tiene, porque le falta
marihuana que fumar.

Ya murió la cucaracha
ya la llevan a enterrar
entre cuatro zopilotes
y un ratón de sacristán.

Translation:

The cockroach, the cockroach,
can't walk any more
because it doesn't have, because it's lacking
marihuana to smoke.

The cockroach just died
they are taking it to be buried,
among four vultures
and a sacristan's mouse.

That version, popular among Villista soldiers, contains hidden political meanings, as is common for revolutionary songs. The cockroach represents President Victoriano Huerta, a notorious drunk who was considered a villain and traitor due to his part in the death of revolutionary President Francisco Madero.

Due to the multi-factional nature of the Mexican Revolution, competing versions were also common, including the Huertista, anti-Carranza stanza:

Spanish

Ya se van los carrancistas,
ya se van haciendo bola,
ya los chacales huertistas
se los trayen de la cola.

Translation:

And the Carrancistas,
are on full retreat,
and the Huertistan jackals
have them caught by the tail.

An example of two Zapatista stanzas is:

Spanish

Oigan con gusto estos versos
escuchen con atención,
ya la pobre cucaracha
no consigue ni un tostón.

Todo se ha puesto muy caro
con esta Revolución,
venden la leche por onzas
y por gramos el carbón.

Translation:

Hear with pleasure these verses,
listen carefully:
now the poor cockroach
doesn't even get a tostón (a 50 centavo or cent coin)

Everything's become very expensive
with this Revolution,
they sell milk by the ounce
and coal by the gram.

"La Cucaracha" was a popular tune among Mexican civilians at the time, and there are numerous examples of non-aligned political verses. Many were general complaints about the hardships created by the war, and were often written by pro-Zapatistas. Other non-aligned verses contained references to various factions, in a non-judgmental manner:

Spanish

El que persevera alcanza
dice un dicho verdadero
yo lo que quiero es venganza
por la muerte de Madero.

Todos se pelean la silla
que les deja mucha plata
En el norte vive Villa
en el sur vive Zapata.

Translation:

He who perseveres, achieves
Tells a true saying
What I want is revenge
For the death of Madero.

Everyone fights for the chair
Which gives them much money
In the north lives Villa,
In the south lives Zapata.

=== La Cucaracha as a woman ===
Soldiering has been a profession for women in Mexico since pre-Columbian times. Among the nicknames for women warriors, and camp followers, were Soldaderas, Adelitas, Juanas, and Cucarachas.

Soldiers in Porfirio Díaz's army sang "La Cucaracha" about a soldadera who wanted money to go to the bullfights. In Mexican Military: Myth and History, Elizabeth Salas writes that, for the Villistas, "'La cucaracha' wanted money for alcohol and marijuana. She was often so drunk or stoned that she could not walk straight. Unlike corridos about male revolutionaries like Villa and Zapata, none of the well-known corridos about soldaderas give their real names or are biographical. Consequently, there are very few stanzas that ring true about women in battle or the camps."

=== Other verses ===
Apart from verses making explicit or implicit reference to historical events, hundreds of other verses exist. Some are new, and others are ancient, but the lack of references and the largely oral tradition of the song, makes dating the verses difficult, if not impossible. Some examples are:

Spanish

Cuando uno quiere a una
y esta una no lo quiere,
es lo mismo que si un calvo
en la calle encuentra un peine.

Mi vecina de enfrente
se llamaba Doña Clara,
y si no se hubiera muerto
aún así se llamaría.

Translation:

When a man loves a woman
but she doesn't love him back,
it's like a bald man
finding a comb in the street.

My neighbor across the street
was called Doña Clara, [English: Mrs. Clara]
and if she hadn't died
that's what she would still be called.

== Influences ==
In the 1945 novel Animal Farm by George Orwell, the animals' rebellion song, "Beasts of England", is described as a blend of the tunes of "La Cucaracha" and "Oh My Darling, Clementine".
