= Gottfried Prehauser =

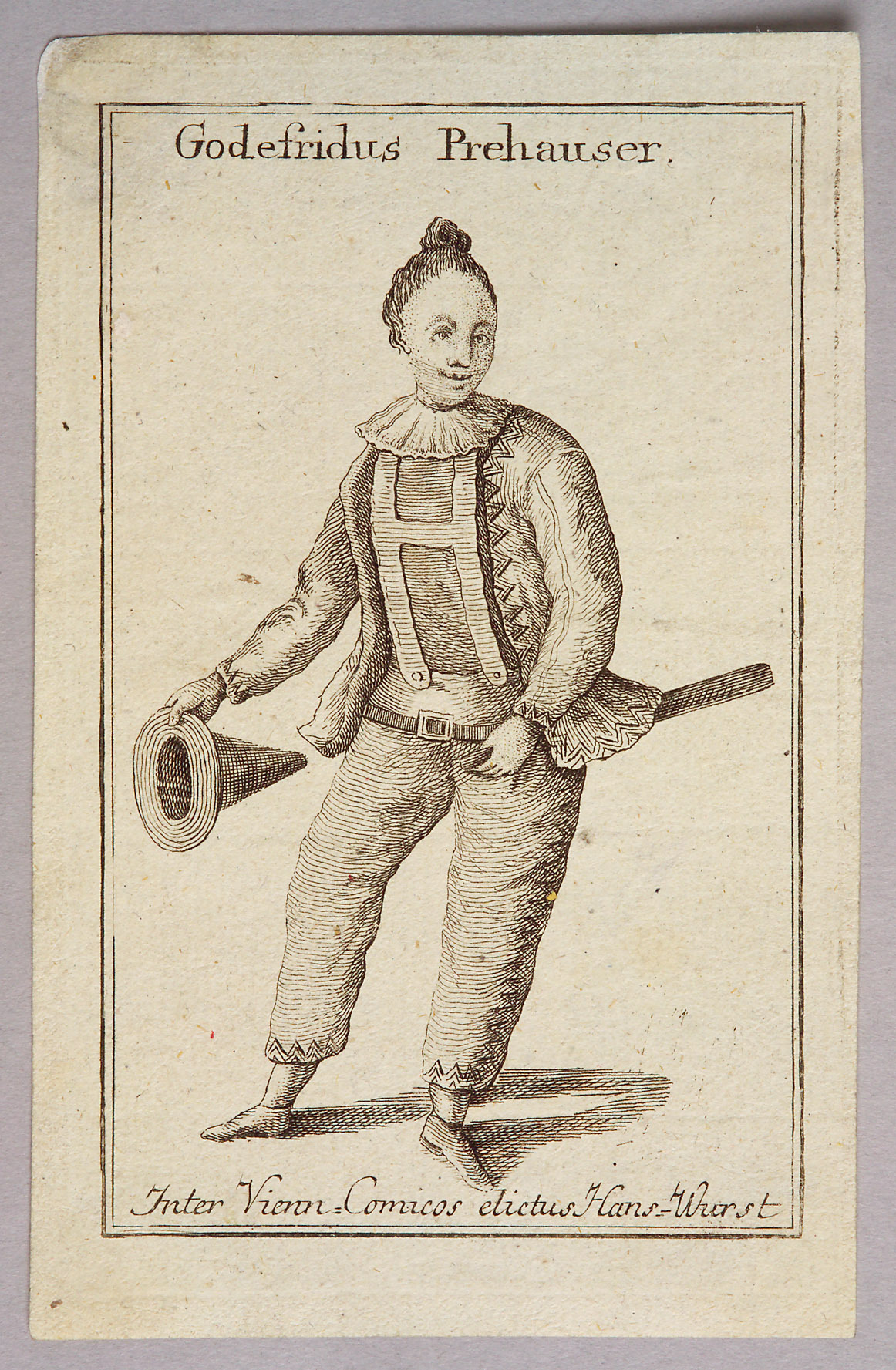
Gottfried Prehauser as Hanswurst

Gottfried Prehauser (8 November 1699 – 30 January 1769) was an Austrian actor and playwright. In 1912 the Prehausergasse in Wien-Hietzing was named after him.

== Life ==
He was born in Vienna, son of a count's steward. At a very young age he became a field page in Hungary. Aged seventeen he joined a travelling theatre troupe, initially performing in Vienna's suburbs, for which he played princes and lovers. After appearances with the Viennese Puppet Theatre, Prehauser toured south Germany and Austria as comedian.

Around 1720 his director Hilverding persuaded him to play the stock character of Hanswurst in Salzburg. He became known as the 'Salzburg Hanswurst' and as such caught the attention of Viennese theatre director Josef Anton Stranitzky.

Prehauser initially toured with that troupe through Bohemia, Moravia and Germany until arriving back in Vienna in 1725. At the Kärntnertortheater, where Stranitzky introduced him as his successor, he became the 'New Viennese Hanswurst'. After Stranitzky's death he took over as leader of the 'German Comedians'.

Prehauser was an outstanding interpreter of improvisational theatre as well as 'regular' plays such as those by Gotthold Ephraim Lessing). He wrote local plays and local farces for Old Viennese Folk Theatre and satirical-humorous 'New Year's greetings'.

== Radio-play versions of Hanswurst ==
- 1926: Hanswurst, der traurige Küchelbäcker – Production: Funk-Stunde Berlin; Editing: Max Bauer; Director: Alfred Braun

Actors:

  - Karl Ebert
  - Hermann Vallentin
  - Leonore Ehn
  - Lore Braun
  - Grete Wiedecke
  - Peter Großmann
- 1927: Hans-Wurst. Der traurige Küchelbäcker und sein Freund in der Not – Production: Nordische Rundfunk AG; Editing: Max Bauer; Director: Hermann Beyer

Actors:

  - Karl Pündter: Gutherz, a rich man
  - Eugen Moebius: Taddäus, his cousin
  - Edith Scholz: Leni, his housekeeper
  - Maria Lorenz: Gretle, his Swabian maid
  - Hans Freundt: Hanswurst, a poor cake baker

== Bibliography (in German) ==
- Constantin von Wurzbach: 'Prehauser, Gottfried'. In: Biographisches Lexikon des Kaiserthums Oesterreich. 23. Theil. Kaiserlich-königliche Hof- und Staatsdruckerei, Vienna 1872, p. 246–249
- Eduard Devrient, Dramatische und dramaturgische Schriften, Vol. 5, p. 340 Online version.
- Bärbel Rudin: Gottfried Prehauser und Franz Ludwig von Pfalz-Neuburg, Reisende mit Pritsche und Mitra. "Abgott" Hanswurst – zur polyzentralen Logistik des Schauspielgewerbes. In: Das Achtzehnte Jahrhundert und Österreich, Jg. 33, 2018
- Carl Ferdinand Pohl: Joseph Haydn, Vol. 1,
