= Johann Baptist Hilverding =

Austrian puppeteer (1677–1721)

Johann Baptist Hilverding (19 December 1677 - 28/29 August 1721) was an Austrian puppeteer, actor and theatre manager. His surname is sometimes also spelled Helferting, Hübfertin, Hielferding, Hilluerding or Höllwerding.

== Life ==
He was born in Salzburg, to Johann Peter Hilverding, a puppeteer and court comedian in that city. He spent his childhood there until in 1685 he joined a tour to Vienna. He performed as a puppeteer in Vienna in 1698 and soon afterwards married Margarethe Maria Roset, from a wealthy family of showmen. The couple then toured to Dresden (1699), Frankfurt am Main and Prague, later also touring to Cologne and St. Gallen (1702). As a distiller Hilverding acquired citizenship of Vienna.

His intensive collaboration with Joseph Anton Stranitzky led to the 1705-1707 foundation of the first theatrical enterprise in Vienna, which was interrupted by the official mourning after the deaths of Leopold I and Joseph I. He was part of the reopened Kärntnerthortheater from 1714 onwards, sharing its lease with Stranitzky from 1716 to 1718. After the theatre was ceded to rival Italian actors from 1719 onwards Hilverding and P. J. Tilly went to Augsburg until the distribution of privileges was clarified, where Gottfried Prehauser joined the troupe. After that they performed in Ulm and Breslau, where they spent the winter following a cancellation from Prague. After a long wait, the imperial privilege finally summoned him back to the Kärntnertor Theatre. Hilverding focused primarily on renewing the repertoire by acquiring numerous opera libretti and commissioning F. B. Werner to translate them "in a comic-theatrical style".

He died of a stroke in a carriage en route between Unterwaltersdorf and Vienna, probably near Velm or Moosbrunn, leaving his widow (who later married Prehauser) and ten children an estate of 5,246 guilders and 6 kreuzers. He was buried in Velm cemetery on 29 August 1721.

== Work ==
Hilverding evolved from a successful puppeteer into a theatre director. Alongside his collaboration with Stranitzky, he continued working as a puppeteer at least until the death of Joseph I, so that during the years of mourning and plague from 1711 to 1713 he was forced to travel from place to place as a puppeteer. At the Kärntnertor Theater, he later excelled in the role of Anselmo. His efforts to expand and renew the repertoire through the adaptation of opera libretti were later continued, primarily by Heinrich Rademin.

== Bibliography (in German) ==
- Hilde Haider-Pregler (1972). "Hilverding, Johann Baptist". Neue Deutsche Biographie (in German). Vol. 9. Berlin: Duncker & Humblot. p. 167. (full text online).
