= Francisco Rodríguez Marín =

Spanish poet, paremiologist and lexicologist

The Most Excellent Francisco Rodríguez Marín
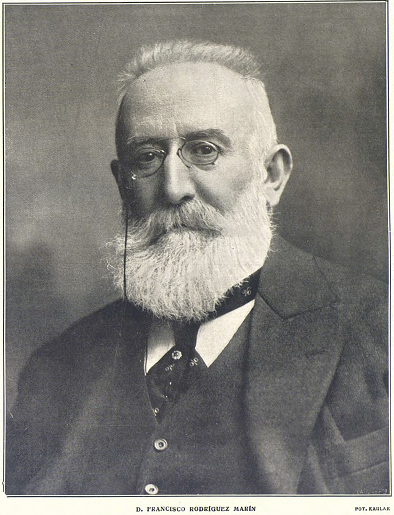
- Portrait by Kaulak published in La Esfera
- Born: Francisco Rodríguez Marín; 27 January 1855; Osuna (Seville), Spain
- Died: 9 June 1943 (aged 88); Madrid, Spain

Seat g of the Real Academia Española
- In office 27 de Octubre de 1907 – 9 June 1943
- Preceded by: Raimundo Fernández-Villaverde
- Succeeded by: Esteban Terradas i Illa

Director of the Real Academia Española
- In office 5 December 1940 – 9 June 1943
- Preceded by: José María Pemán
- Succeeded by: Miguel Asín Palacios

Francisco Rodríguez Marín (Osuna, January 27, 1855–Madrid, June 9, 1943) was a Spanish poet, paremiologist, and lexicologist.

== Biography ==
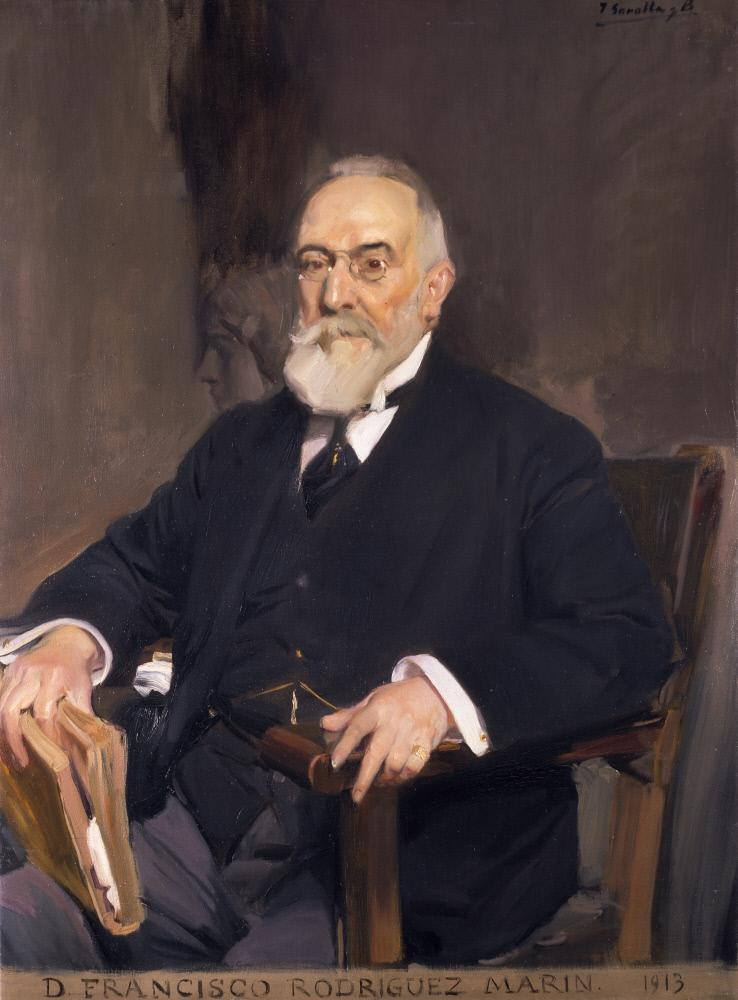
Francisco Rodríguez Marín (1913), by Joaquín Sorolla (The Hispanic Society of America, New York).

Rodríguez Marín finished his high school in Osuna, and later spent three years at the "Viña de Pago Dulce" estate. He studied law at the University of Seville and became interested in Spanish popular songs through the Sociedad del Folk-Lore Andaluz, which he co-founded in 1881. There he met Antonio Machado y Álvarez, Alejandro Guichot and Luis Montoto among other scholars.

In 1883 he returned to Osuna, where he worked as a lawyer. In 1885 he married Dolores Vecino, with whom he would have several children. He also devoted himself to journalism and poetry. In 1897 he almost lost his voice due to a laryngeal operation. He worked as an editor of the Sevillian magazine "La Enciclopedia", where for some time he was responsible for a column entitled "Vulgar Poems". He collaborated with the local newspapers "El Alabardero", "El Posibilista" and "La Tribuna", and the Madrid newspaper "La Mañana".

He was interested above all in traditional popular literature, Cervantes, and Andalusian literature. In 1895 he met Marcelino Menéndez y Pelayo in Seville, and was appointed full professorship at the "Real Academia Sevillana de Buenas Letras". In 1897 he was appointed councillor of the city council of Seville. On October 27, 1907, he started teaching at the "Real Academia Española"(RAE). He also directed the National Library of Madrid (1912-1930).

In 1927 he was elected to teach at the Royal Academy of History. In 1931 his wife, Dolores Vecino, died. During the Civil War he took refuge for twenty-six months in the La Mancha town of Piedrabuena (Ciudad Real), where his daughter Carlota lived. There he wrote "En un lugar de La Mancha". On 5 December 1940, he was appointed director of the Royal Spanish Academy. He died in 1943.

He published three editions of Don Quixote. A fourth edition, today the most known, appeared in 1947–1949. He also published editions of other works by Miguel de Cervantes and collections of unpublished Cervantes documents, as well as many collections of Spanish songs and proverbs. He was also a biobibliographer of Pedro Espinosa, and printed the poetry of Baltasar del Alcázar and El diablo cojuelo by Luis Vélez de Guevara.

As a poet, he wrote madrigals and sonnets in theme and style of the Golden Age. His poems were compiled under the title of "A la real de España". Selected Poems (1871-1941) (Madrid: Imprenta Prensa Española, 1942) and a collection of his press articles were published by the Association of Friends of Rodríguez Marín (Madrid, 1957). He also compiled the correspondence exchanged with his friend Marcelino Menéndez y Pelayo (Epistolario de Menéndez Pelayo y Rodríguez Marín, 1891–1912).

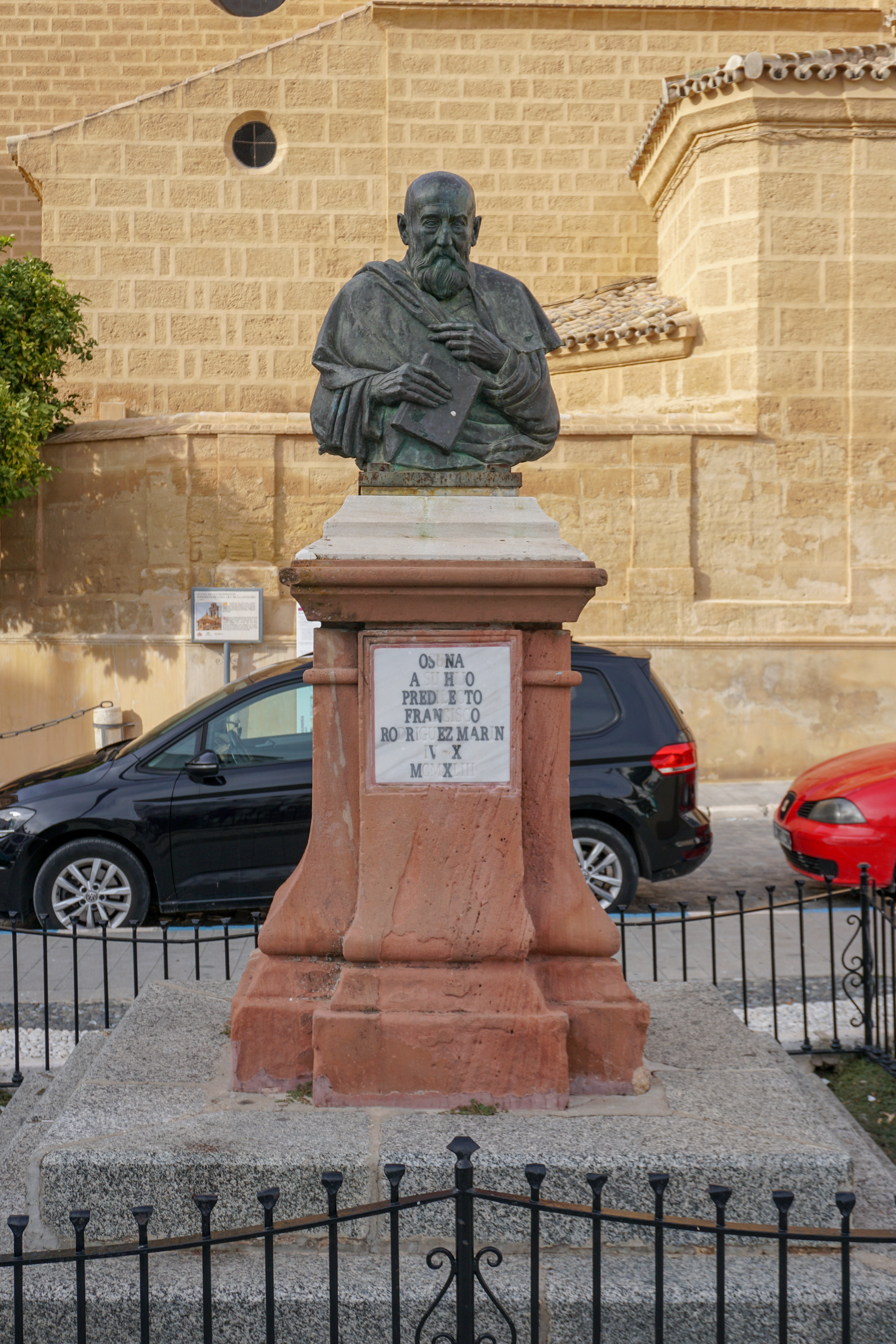
Statue to Francisco Rodríguez Marín in Osuna

== Works ==
- Suspiros, Sevilla, 1875
- Auroras y nubes: poesías, Sevilla, 1878.
- Entre dos luces. Artículos jocoserios y poesías agridulces, Sevilla, 1879.
- Basta de abusos: El pósito del doctor Navarro: su fundación y su estado actual, Sevilla: Imprenta de El Eco de Sevilla, 1880.
- Los cuentezuelos populares andaluces anotados, 1880.
- Tanto tienes, tanto vales, comedia en un acto y en verso, Sevilla, 1882 (2.º ed.)
- Quinientas comparaciones populares andaluzas, Osuna, 1884.
- Juan del Pueblo: historia amorosa popular, Sevilla, 1882; 2.ª ed. 1903.
- Historias vulgares, Sevilla, 1882.
- Cantos populares españoles recogidos, 1882–1883.
- Los refranes andaluces de Meteorología, 1883; 2.ª ed. Sevilla, 1894.
- "Cantar de los Cantares", Osuna, 1885.
- Apuntes y documentos para la historia de Osuna, Osuna, 1889.
- Nueva premática del tiempo, 1891.
- Flores y frutos: poesías (1879-1891), Sevilla, 1891.
- Sonetos y sonetillos, Sevilla, 1893.
- De rebusco: sonetos Sevilla: 1894.
- Ciento y un sonetos de Francisco de Osuna y de Francisco Rodríguez Marín, Sevilla, 1895.
- Madrigales, Sevilla, 1896.
- Los refranes del Almanaque, explicados y concordados con los de varios países románicos, Sevilla, 1896.
- Edición de Primera parte de las flores de poetas ilustres de España ordenada por Pedro Espinosa, Sevilla, 1896.
- Comentarios en verso escritos en 1599 para un libro que se había de publicar en 1896, Sevilla, 1897.
- Fruslerías anecdóticas, Sevilla, 1898.
- La onza de oro y la perra chica, Sevilla, 1898; 2.ª ed. Sevilla, 1899.
- Mil trescientas comparaciones populares andaluzas recogidas de la tradición oral: concordadas con las de algunos países románicos y anotadas, Sevilla, 1899.
- Luis Barahona de Soto: estudio biográfico, bibliográfico y crític, Madrid: Estab. tip. Sucesores de Rivadeneyra, 1903.
- Rinconete y Cortadillo, Sevilla, 1905.
- Pedro Espinosa: estudio biográfico, bibliográfico y crítico, Madrid, 1907.
- Rodríguez Marín, Francisco (1907). Vida de Mateo Alemán, 1908.
- Quisicosillas. Nuevas narraciones anecdóticas, Madrid: Biblioteca Patria, 1910.
- Edición de Obras de Pedro Espinosa, Madrid, 1909.
- Don Quijote de «Clásicos La Lectura», 1911–1913.
- Edición de Cristóbal Suárez de Figueroa, El pasajero: Advertencias utilísimas a la vida humana, Madrid: Renacimiento, 1913.
- Edición de Don Quijote, 1916–1917.
- Edición de Luis Vélez de Guevara, El diablo cojuelo, Madrid: Ediciones de «La Lectura», 1918.
- Cincuenta cuentos anecdóticos, Madrid: Tipografía de la Revista de Archivos, Bibliotecas y Museos, 1919.5
- Dos mil quinientas voces castizas y bien autorizadas que piden lugar en nuestro léxico, Madrid, 1922.
- Nuevos datos para las biografías de cien escritores de los siglos XVI y XVII, Madrid, 1923.
- Más de 21000 refranes castellanos no contenidos en la copiosa colección del maestro Gonzalo *Correas allegolos de la tradición oral y de sus lecturas, Madrid, 1926.
- Edición "crítica" de Don Quijote, 1927–1928.
- El alma de Andalucía en sus mejores coplas amorosas escogidas entre más de 22.000, Madrid, 1929. *Hay facsímil de Madrid: Editorial Atlas, 1975.
- Modos adverbiales castizos y bien autorizados que piden lugar en nuestro léxico, Madrid, 1931.
- Zorrilla comentador póstumo de sus biógrafos. Cartas íntimas e inéditas del gran poeta español (1883-1889), 1934.
- El doctor Gimeno como literato, 1934.
- 6666 refranes de mi última rebusca, 1934.
- 250 refranes recogidos en Piedrabuena, 1938.
- En un lugar de La Mancha, 1939
- Todavía 10.700 refranes más. Madrid, 1941.

== Bibliography ==
- Diccionario de literatura española. Madrid: Revista de Occidente, 1964 (3ª ed.)
- Daniel Eisenberg, "Balance del cervantismo de Francisco Rodríguez Marín", en Actas del Coloquio Internacional «Cervantes en Andalucía», Estepa (España), Ayuntamiento, 1999, pp. 54–64.
- Ramírez Olid, José Manuel: "Rodríguez Marín, íntimo". Cuadernos de los Amigos de los Museos de Osuna, n.º 8, diciembre, 2006, págs. 9–13. ISSN 1697-1019
- Ramírez Olid, José Manuel: "Rodríguez Marín y su relación con personajes destacados de su época". Cuadernos de los Amigos de los Museos de Osuna, n.º 12–13, diciembre de 2010.; diciembre, 2011, págs. 35-38/20-25. ISSN 1697-1019
- Ramírez Olid, José Manuel: Cartas de Francisco Rodríguez Marín an Antonio Maura (1905-1925). Diputación Provincial de Sevilla, 2012. ISBN 978-84-7798-326-2
- Rayego Gutiérrez, Joaquín, Vida y personalidad de D. Francisco Rodríguez Marín, Bachiller de Osuna, ISBN 978-84-7798-184-8, Servicio de Publicaciones: Diputación Provincial de Sevilla, 2002. 978-84-7798-184-8
