= Der krumme Teufel =

First opera written by Joseph Haydn

- Singspiel by Joseph Haydn
- Portrait of Haydn by Thomas Hardy, in 1791
- Translation: The Lame Devil
- Librettist: Joseph Felix von Kurz
- Language: German
- Based on: Le Diable boiteux by Alain-René Lesage
- Premiere: 29 May 1753; Kärntnertortheater, Vienna

Der krumme Teufel (The Lame Devil or "The Limping Devil", 1751 or 1752), Hob. 29/1a, was Joseph Haydn's first opera. This German-language comic opera in the genre of Singspiel was commissioned by its librettist, leading comic actor Joseph Felix von Kurz, from the French novel Le Diable boiteux by Alain-René Lesage. It was forbidden after two acclaimed performances in Vienna due to "offensive remarks in the text", but later revived and probably revised as Der neue krumme Teufel ("The New Lame Devil", 1757 or 1758), Hob. 29/1b. The music is lost, though a libretto survives for each version.

== Description ==
The title Der krumme Teufel is often translated as "The Lame Devil", "The Limping Devil", or The Crooked Devil, and has at times been rendered as The Stooped Devil or altered to The Deceitful Devil.

The opera was in the genre of Singspiel, with spoken dialogue rather than recitative. The music was intended as a vehicle for Joseph Felix von Kurz, who wrote the text under the stage name "Bernardon". Kurz was a leading comic actor at the time in Vienna, whose troupe performed at the Kärntnertortheater.

The text is often seen as a satire of the limping Italian Giuseppe Affligio (1722–1788), a shady adventurer who established himself in Vienna as impresario and theatre director (later involved with Mozart, then arrested for forgery in 1778 and condemned to life imprisonment in 1779), but others dispute that he was already in Vienna around 1751 and also consider unlikely that the revised version's 1770 performance was about him.

== Composition ==
Haydn wrote the opera at a very early stage of his career. Having recently lost his soprano voice, and hence his job as a chorister at St. Stephen's Cathedral, Haydn was maintaining a precarious existence as a freelance musician. One way he supplemented his income was as a street serenader, which was how he came to get his first operatic commission. The story is told as follows in the early biography of Haydn by Georg August Griesinger (1810), who based his account on Haydn's reminiscences in old age:

Once he went to serenade the wife of Kurz, a comic actor very popular at the time and usually called Bernardon. Kurz came into the street and asked for the composer of the music just played. Hardly had Haydn, who was about nineteen years old, identified himself when Kurz urged him strongly to compose an opera for him.

Another contemporary biographer who interviewed Haydn was Albert Christoph Dies (1810). His version of the tale (in which Haydn is said to be 21, not 19) characteristically embellishes that of Griesinger, giving details of how the comic actor conducted the interview:

‘You sit down at the Flügel {said Kurz} and accompany the pantomime I will act out for you with some suitable music. Imagine now Bernardon has fallen into the water and is trying to save himself by swimming.’ Then he calls his servant, throws himself flat on the stomach across a chair, makes the servant pull the chair to and fro around the room, and kicks his arms and legs like a swimmer, while Haydn expresses in six-eight time the play of waves and swimming. Suddenly Bernardon springs up, embraces Haydn, and practically smothers him with kisses. ‘Haydn, you're the man for me! You must write me an opera!’ So began Der krumme Teufel {The Lame Devil}. Haydn received twenty-five ducats for it and counted himself rich indeed.

== Reception ==
According to Dies, "This opera was performed twice to great acclaim, and then was forbidden because of offensive remarks in the text." However, the work was performed again in 1752, and a revised version, Der neue krumme Teufel ("The Return of the Lame Devil", lit. "The New Limping Devil"), Hob. 29/1b, was successfully performed in 1757 or 1758.

Peter Branscombe reconstructs the musical ensembles from the surviving libretto, indicating it was a fairly ambitious work: there were "32 arias as well as a duet, a trio, three choruses and one ambitiously large-scale ensemble movement". The opera also included a pantomime.

James Van Horn Melton suggests that Haydn went on to compose further works for Kurz, all now lost:

It is now generally believed he composed the music for numerous other Kurz burlesques as well. Extant scores from Kurz's stage point to Haydn as composer of at least three other farces, Bernardon auf der Gelseninsel (Bernardon on the isle of mosquitoes, 1754), Der auf das neue begeisterte und belebte Bernardon (Bernardon revived, 1754), and Leopoldl, der deutsche Robinson (Leopoldl, the German Robinson Crusoe, 1756?), since they contain passages similar to those found in other Haydn works. The finale of Haydn’s keyboard sonata in A major (Hoboken XVI. 5), for example, has as its theme an almost literal quotation from the aria "Wurstl, mein Schatzerl, wo wirst Du wohl seyn" in Leopoldl, der deutsche Robinson.

Der krumme Teufel, and the collaboration with Kurz more generally, helped the early career success of Haydn, who by 1757 was no longer a struggling freelancer but a Kapellmeister with his own orchestra to direct; see Count Morzin.

== Notes ==
=== Sources ===
Primary sources

- Dies, Albert Christoph (1810). Biographical Accounts of Joseph Haydn, Vienna. English translation by Vernon Gotwals, in Haydn: Two Contemporary Portraits (1968), Milwaukee: University of Wisconsin Press.
- Griesinger, Georg August (1810). Biographical Notes Concerning Joseph Haydn, Leipzig: Breitkopf und Härtel. English translation by Vernon Gotwals, in Haydn: Two Contemporary Portraits (1968), Milwaukee: University of Wisconsin Press.

Secondary sources

- Badura-Skoda, Eva (1973). "The Influence of the Viennese Popular Comedy on Haydn and Mozart", Proceedings of the Royal Musical Association, vol. 100 (1973–1974), 15 pages (pp. 185–199), JSTOR 766183.
- Beghin, Tom, & Goldberg, Sander M. (2007). Haydn and the Performance of Rhetoric, University of Chicago Press, 366 pages, ISBN 978-0-226-04129-2.
- Branscombe, Peter (1971). "The Singspiel in the Late 18th Century", The Musical Times, vol. 112, no. 1537 (March 1971), JSTOR 956397, pp. 226–228.
- Branscombe, Peter, & Clark, Caryl (2007). "Haydn", in New Grove Dictionary of Opera, online version.
- Butterworth, Neil (1978 [1977]). Haydn: His Life and Times, Midas Books, 144 pages, ISBN 0-85936-030-X.
- Melton, James Van Horn (2004). "School, Stage, Salon: Musical Cultures in Haydn's Vienna", The Journal of Modern History, vol. 76, no. 2, Special Issue on Cultural Practices (June 2004), JSTOR 3555456, pp. 251–279.
