= El diablo cojuelo =

1641 novel by Luis Vélez de Guevara

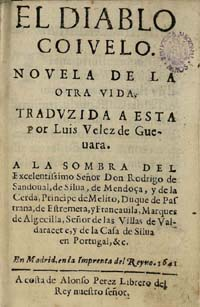
El diablo cojuelo

The Limping Devil (Spanish: El diablo cojuelo) is the most famous work of Luis Vélez de Guevara and his only novel, published in 1641. In 1918 an edition published by Francisco Rodríguez Marín became well known. The story is about a student that takes the devil out of a flask where a magician had locked him. The devil, grateful, shows the student the interior of houses (as if they were toys). This way, they are able to contemplate its inhabitants in their privacy. Alain-René Lesage adapted it in his novel Le Diable boiteux (1707; The Devil upon Two Sticks).

== English translations ==
- The Limping Devil - El Diablo Cojuelo - Bilingual Edition. Stockcero, 2018. ISBN 978-1-934768-92-1

== See also ==
- Spanish science fiction
