= Josef Anton Stranitzky =

Austrian playwright (1676–1726)

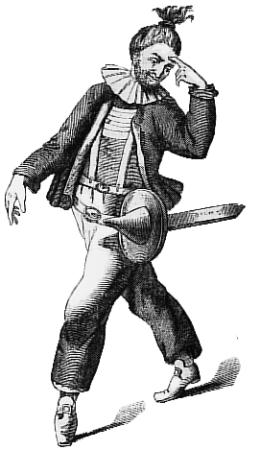
Stranitzky in costume as Hans Wurst - his posture reveals his dance training.

Joseph Anton Stranitzky (10 September 1676 - 19 May 1726) was an Austrian actor, puppeteer, playwright and theatre manager. He is considered the founder of the Old Viennese Folk Theatre and the inventor of the Viennese Hanswurst character who appears in it. He was also a dentist certified by the Medical Faculty of Vienna. In 1938, "Stranitzkygasse" in Vienna-Meidling was named after him.

== Life ==
He was allegedly born in Knittelfeld/Steiermark and is presumed to have been a son of Wenzel Stranitzky („Wenceslaus Strännitzgy“) and his wife Maria Barbara Stranitzky, He joined a travelling troupe that performed in Munich in 1699 and was already working as an independent operator of a puppet theatre in southern Germany at that time. Around 1705, he and his wife Maria Monica settled in Vienna. In 1706, he performed at the Neuer Markt (New Market) in Vienna, still in wooden booths. In 1711, he started leasing the Kärntnertor Theater, a new stone building.

With his "German comedians" troupe (founded in 1706) he started competing with the commedia dell'arte performers. He developed his own comic character, the Viennese hanswurst, considerably cruder than the stock characters of Italian improvisational comedy, but so successful that it was imitated and adopted by other performers, such as Stranitzky's son-in-law and successor Gottfried Prehauser.

Stranitzky was also a wine merchant and practiced as a surgeon, quack doctor and "tooth puller", a profession he had learned from an itinerant physician, with whom he had probably travelled to fairs as a young man. Actors often took on the then-rougher medical tasks such as surgery and dentistry, which mostly consisted of amputation and tooth extraction. Stranitzky was eventually even examined by the Vienna Medical Faculty to practice as a "dentist and oral surgeon." His son Augustin (1712–1740) also practiced dentistry.

He died in 1726 in the "Comödi Haus" near the old Carinthian Gate in Vienna. The official cause of death was listed as "internal necrosis."

== Work ==
Stranitzky parodied and travestied courtly operas, which he translated from Italian and French, and added his caricatured Hanswurst figure into them, also known as "Hans Sausakh von Wurstelfeld". A whole series of texts from such "Haupt- und Staatsaktionen" (main and state actions) have survived.

== Works ==
- Lustige Reyss-Beschreibung aus Saltzburg in verschiedene Länder (c. 1707)
- Ollapatrida des durchgetriebenen Fuchsmundi (1711) (Ausg. Wien 1886 online is available for free viewing and download at the Internet Archive)

=== Expenditure ===
- Rudolf Payer von Thurn (ed.): Wiener Haupt- und Staatsaktionen, 2 Bde., Wien: Literarischer Verein 1908/12.
- Josef Anton Stranitzky (et al.): Hanswurstiaden. Ein Jahrhundert Wiener Komödie. Wien: Residenz 2001. ISBN 3-7017-1028-7

== Bibliography ==
- Beatrix Müller-Kampel (2013). "Stranitzky, Joseph Anton". Neue Deutsche Biographie (in German). Vol. 25. Berlin: Duncker & Humblot. p. 473. (full text online).
- Constantin von Wurzbach: "Stranitzky, Joseph Anton." In: Biographisches Lexikon des Kaiserthums Oesterreich (Biographical Lexicon of the Empire of Austria). Part 39 Kaiserlich-königliche Hof- und Staatsdruckerei, Vienna 1879, p. 237–246 (digitalised).
- Otto Rommel: Die Alt-Wiener Volkskomödie. Ihre Geschichte vom barocken Welt-Theater bis zum Tode Nestroys. Schroll, Wien 1952.
- Reinhard Urbach: Die Wiener Komödie und ihr Publikum. Stranitzky und die Folgen. Jugend & Volk, Wien u. a. 1973, ISBN 3-7141-6019-1.
- Ralf Vollmuth: Joseph Anton Stranitzky (1676–1726), Komödiant und Zahnarzt. Ein Beitrag zur Medizin- und Theatergeschichte. In: Würzburger medizinhistorische Mitteilungen. Bd. 23, 2004, ISSN 0177-5227, S. 339–345.
- Ralf Vollmuth: Zwischen Bühne und Zahnarztpraxis. Der Komödiant und Zahnarzt Joseph Anton Stranitzky. In: Harald Salfellner (Hrsg.): Mit Feder und Skalpell. Grenzgänger zwischen Literatur und Medizin. Vitalis, Mitterfels 2014, ISBN 978-3-89919-167-7, S. 11–20.
