= Luis Vélez de Guevara =

Spanish dramatist and novelist (1579–1644)

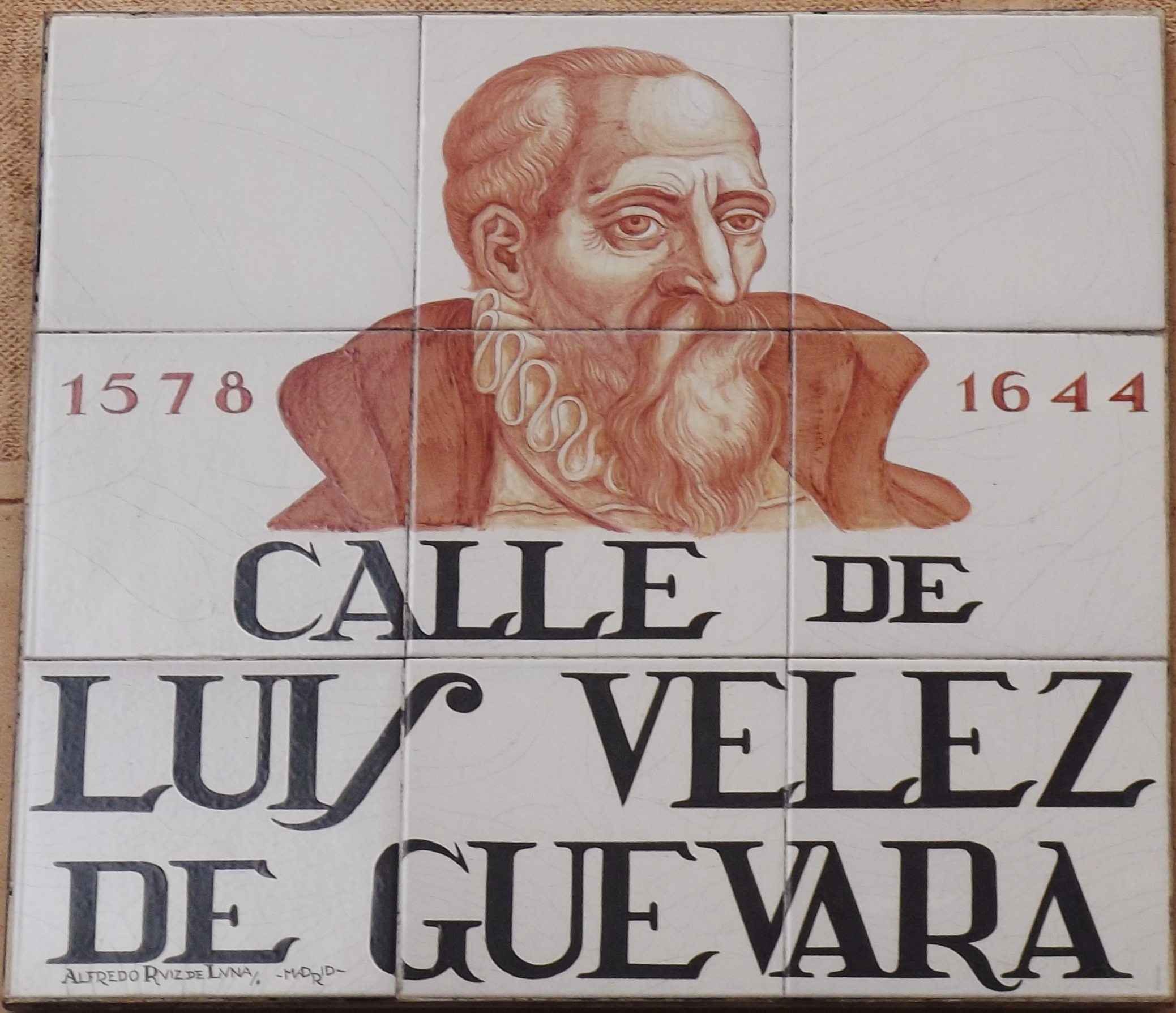
Placa de la calle de Luis Vélez de Guevara

Luis Vélez de Guevara (born Luis Vélez de Santander) (1 August 1579 – 10 November 1644) was a Spanish dramatist and novelist of the Spanish Golden Age. He wrote over 400 plays and is best known for his novel El diablo cojuelo (1641).

== Early life and education ==
De Guevara was born at Écija on 1 August 1579 and was of Jewish converso descent. He graduated as a sizar at the University of Osuna in 1596.

== Career ==
After graduation, de Guevara joined the household of Rodrigo de Castro, Cardinal-Archbishop of Seville, and celebrated the marriage of Philip III in a poem signed Vélez de Santander, a name which he continued to use until some years later.

It seems he served as a soldier in Italy and Algiers, returning to Spain in 1602 when he entered the service of the count de Saldaña, and dedicated himself to writing for the stage. He authored over four hundred plays, of which the best are Reinar despues de morir, La luna de la sierra, and El diablo está en Cantillana. The play Más pesa el rey que la sangre, which translates into "The King weighs more than blood (kinship)" is based on the episode of the Reconquista in which the nobleman Alonso Pérez de Guzmán allows his son to be sacrificed, rather than surrender his King's possession of Tarifa.

However, Vélez de Guevara is most widely known as the author of the novel El diablo cojuelo (1641, "The Lame Devil" or "The Crippled Devil"), a fantastic novel which suggested to Alain-René Lesage the idea for Le Diable boiteux (1707). The plot presents a rascal student who hides in an astrologer's mansard. He frees a devil from a bottle. As an acknowledgement the devil shows him the apartments of Madrid and the tricks, miseries and mischiefs of their inhabitants. A similar theme was suggested by the magic lenses in Los anteojos de mejor vista (1620–1625) by Rodrigo Fernández de Ribera. Charles Dickens refers to El Diablo cojuelo in The Old Curiosity Shop, chapter 33.

== Death ==
De Guevara died at Madrid on 10 November 1644.
