= Le Diable boiteux (novel) =

Novel by Alain-René Lesage

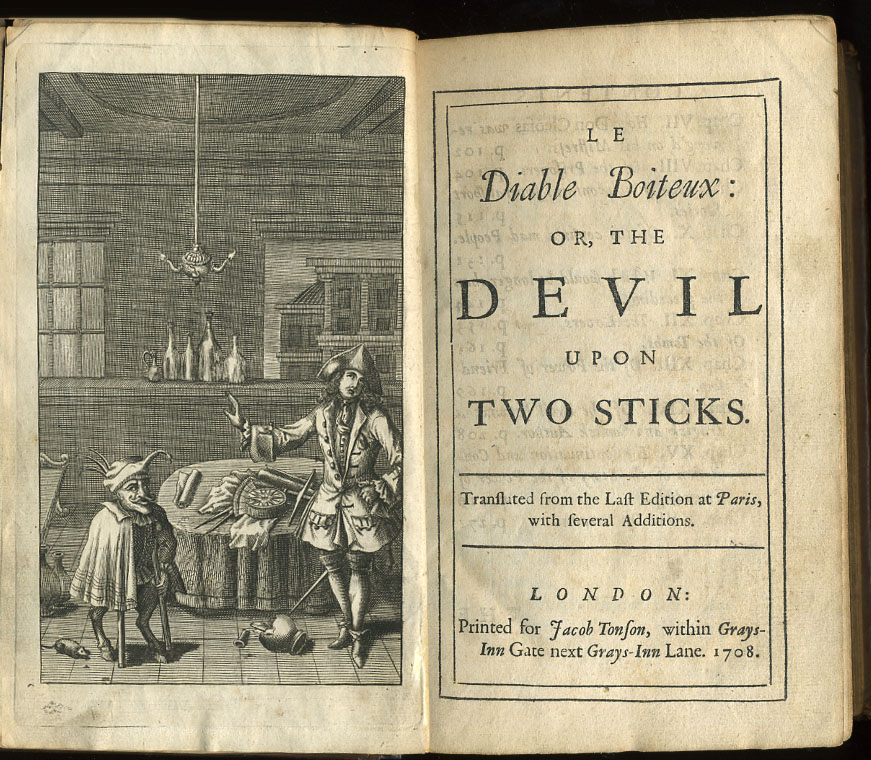
Frontispiece and title page of the first English edition of The Devil upon Two Sticks, 1708

Le Diable boiteux (English: The Devil upon Two Sticks; lit. 'The Lame Devil') is a novel by the French writer Alain-René Lesage. It is set in Madrid, and tells the story of the demon king Asmodeus, Don Cleophas Leandro Perez Zambullo and his beloved, Donna Thomasa.

In the novel, Asmodeus is imprisoned in a bottle. He is freed by a young aristocrat, and then assists his rescuer in a series of pranks. He also grants the young man the superhuman power of flight, which the man uses to spy on others. The novel depicted fictionalized versions of Parisian celebrities of the era.

== Textual history ==
The novel was first published in 1707, and republished by the author, with many changes and additions, in 1725. It is sometimes known in English as Asmodeus, and sometimes as The Devil on Two Sticks, under which title the first English translation appeared in 1708, and was dramatised by Henry Fielding in 1768.

== Source ==
The title and some of the incidents are borrowed from El Diablo cojuelo (1641) by the Spaniard Luis Vélez de Guevara. But after the first few chapters Lesage departs widely from his predecessor. The plan is abandoned, and the new episodes and characters introduced are entirely original with Lesage. Guevara ends his story with abruptness; while the French romancer winds up with a romance, dismissing Don Cleofas to happiness with his beloved Seraphina.

== Plot ==
Don Cleofas (Cleophas), a young Spanish profligate of high lineage, proud and revengeful but brave and generous, delivers from his imprisonment in a bottle the demon Asmodée (Asmodeus); who in gratitude assists him in his pranks, and carries him triumphantly through a series of amusing adventures. Especially does the demon bestow on his deliverer the power of sailing through the air, and seeing through the roofs what is going on within the houses of Madrid.

== Reception ==
Lesage introduced into his story, under Spanish names, many anecdotes and portraits of Parisian celebrities. These were all immediately recognised, and contributed greatly to the contemporary vogue of the novel, which was greater even than that of Gil Blas. It is one of the famous traditions of the book trade that two young French noblemen fought a duel in a bookstore for the possession of the only remaining copy.

== Adaptations ==
- Le Diable boiteux (play), 1707 comedy by Florent Carton Dancourt
- Der krumme Teufel, 1753 Singspiel (lost) by Joseph Haydn
- Le Diable boiteux (opera), 1782 opéra comique by Charles Nicolas Favart
- Le Diable boiteux (ballet), 1836 ballet by Jean Coralli

== Illustrations ==
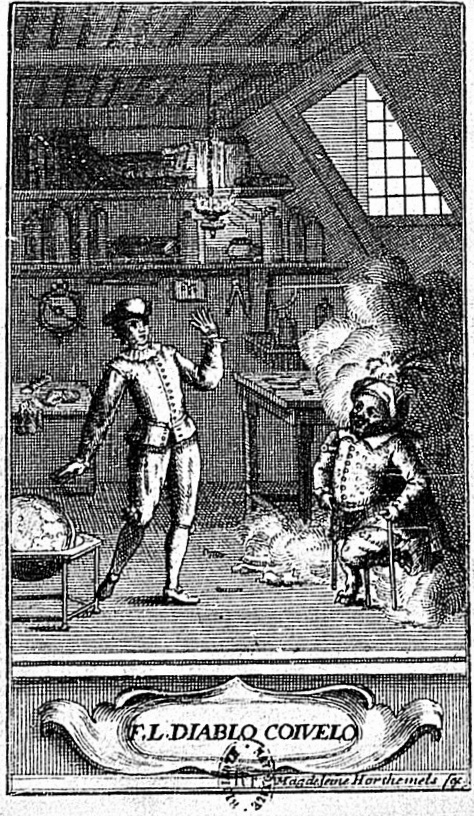
Frontispiece to the first French edition, 1707

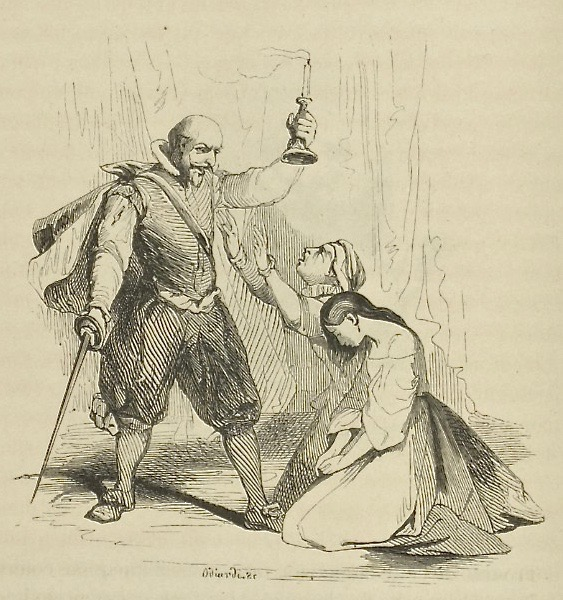
Illustration by Tony Johannot, 1840

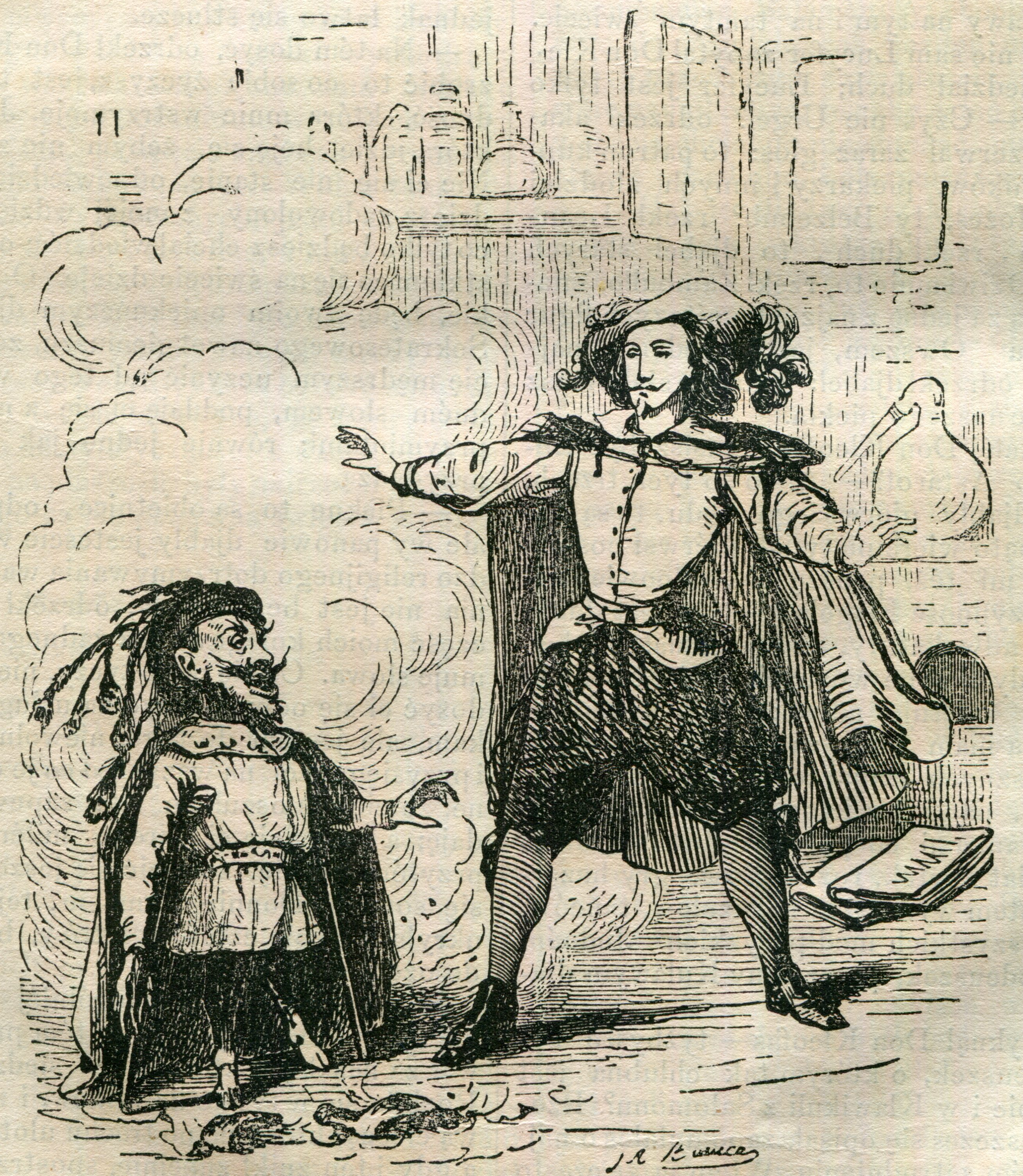
Illustration by Jean-Adolphe Beaucé, 1849

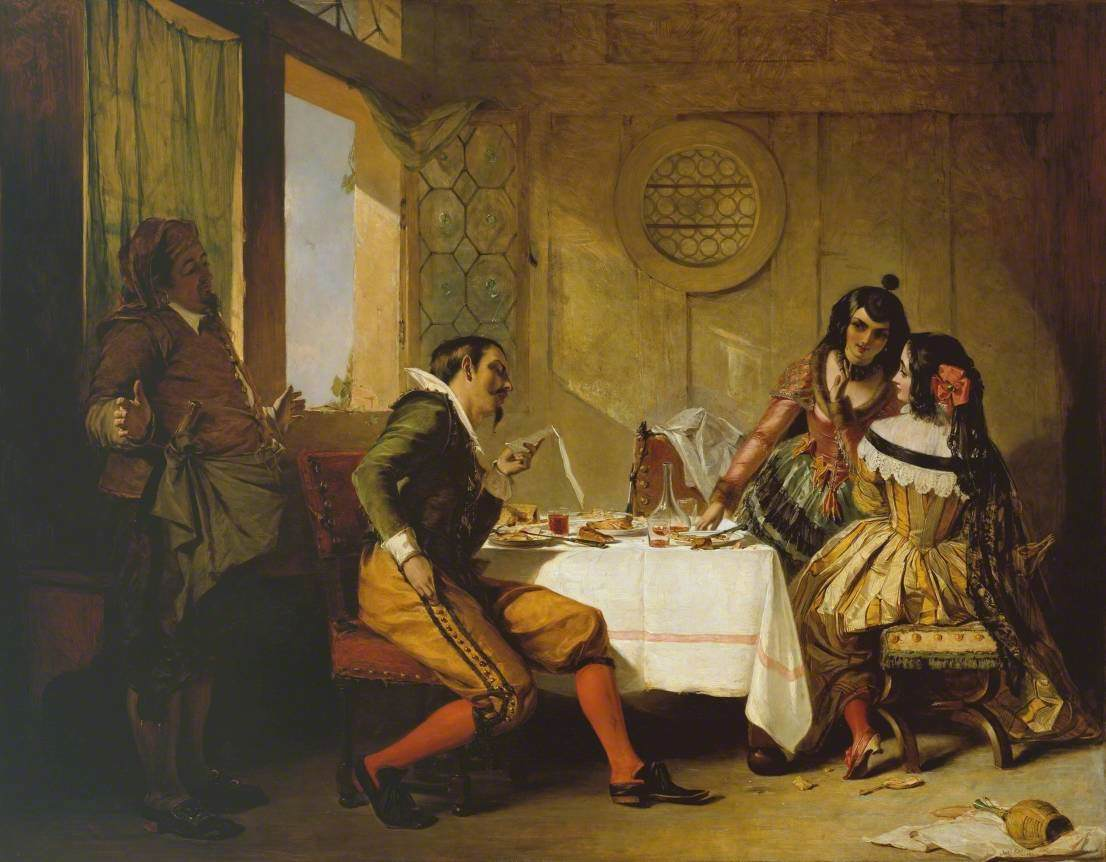
Scene from 'The Devil upon Two Sticks' by Augustus Egg, 1844

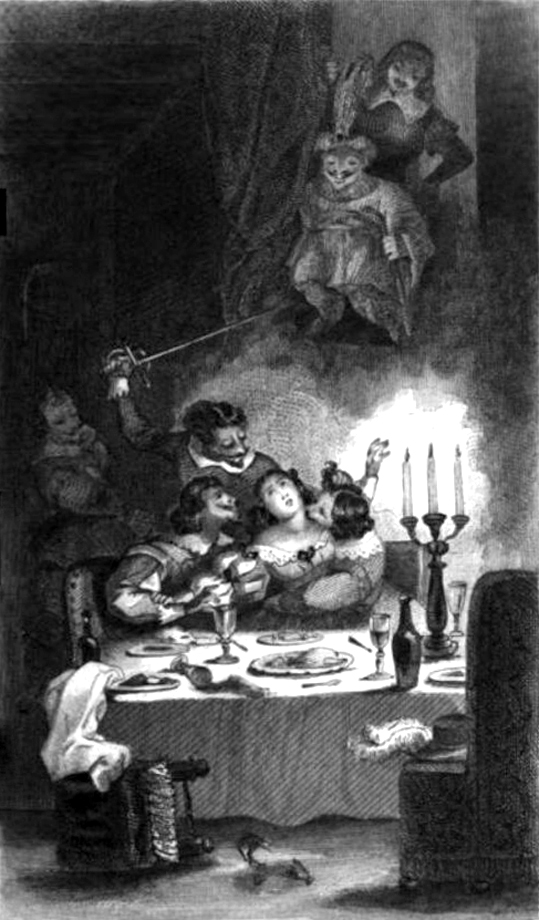
Illustration after drawings by Napoléon Thomas, 1845

== Sources ==
- France, Peter (2005). "Diable boiteux, Le". In The New Oxford Companion to Literature in French. Oxford University Press. Retrieved 24 October 2022.

Attribution:

- Keller, Helen Rex (1924). "Asmodeus, The Lame Devil". In The Reader's Digest of Books. The Library of the World's Best Literature. New York: The Macmillan Company. p. 57.
