= Hanswurst =

Fictional character

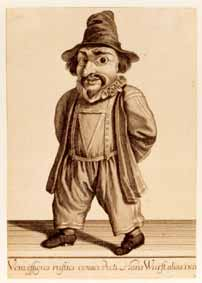

Hanswurst or Hans Wurst (German for "Johnny Sausage") was a popular coarse-comic stock character of German-speaking impromptu comedy. He is "a half doltish, half cunning, partly stupid, partly knowing, enterprising and cowardly, self indulgent and merry fellow, who, in accordance with circumstances, accentuated one or other of these characteristics."

Through the 16th and 17th centuries, he was a buffoon character in rural carnival theaters and touring companies.

== History ==
The name first appeared in a Middle Low German version of Sebastian Brant's Ship of Fools (1494) (using the name Hans myst). "Hanswurst" was also a mockery and insult. Martin Luther used it in his 1541 pamphlet Wider Hans Worst (Against Hanswurst), when he railed against the Catholic Duke Henry of Brunswick.

In 1712, Joseph Anton Stranitzky developed and popularized the role of Hanswurst. The theater historian Otto Rommel saw this as the beginning of the so-called Viennese popular theater. Stranitzky's Hanswurst wore the garb of a peasant from Salzburg, with a wide-brimmed hat on. His humor was often sexual and scatological. The character found numerous imitators.

In the "Hanswurst dispute" of the 1730s the scholar Johann Christoph Gottsched and the actress Friederike Caroline Neuber strove to banish the buffoon from the German-speaking stage, in order to improve the quality of German comedy and raise its social status, holding a public "banishing" of Hanswurst. This met with resistance, especially in Vienna. However, the staged banishment has generally been regarded as an emblematic moment in German theater history for the transition from popular, improvised, so-called Stegreiftheater to a modern bourgeois literary mode.

The last notable Hanswurst was Franz Schuch, who merged Hanswurst with the stock Harlequin character. The Italian-French Harlequin replaced Hanswurst. In the later 18th century Hanswurst was out of fashion and was only used in the puppet theater. Comical characters like Punch or Staberl replaced him for several decades. At the instigation of Joseph of Sonnenfels after the French Revolution (Memorandum for the future of theater censorship guidelines, 1790) the Emperor Joseph II forbade improvised comedy and burlesque-like buffoon games. Due to authoritarian fear of political agitation, arts were directed towards fixed literary form theater (the "regular theater") and silent, music-accompanied pantomime. In 1775, a 26-year-old Johann Wolfgang von Goethe wrote a farce entitled Hanswurst's Wedding. In his 1797 comedy Puss in Boots (Der gestiefelte Kater), Ludwig Tieck brought back the part of Hanswurst. For the Viennese Musical and Theatrical Exhibition of 1892, the actor Ludwig Gottsleben played Hanswurst.

=== 20th century to present ===
The German film comedy The Comedians (1941) by GW Pabst, which was marked by the ideology of the war, portrayed Gotthold Ephraim Lessing, a German national poet, in a victorious battle against the foul-mouthed Hanswurst. The historical Lessing had written Hanswurst into the Hamburg Dramaturgy, and called the banishment "the biggest buffoonery of all" (die größte Harlekinade).
