= Theater am Kärntnertor =

Former theatre and opera house in Vienna, Austria

Coordinates: 48°12′12″N 16°22′15″E

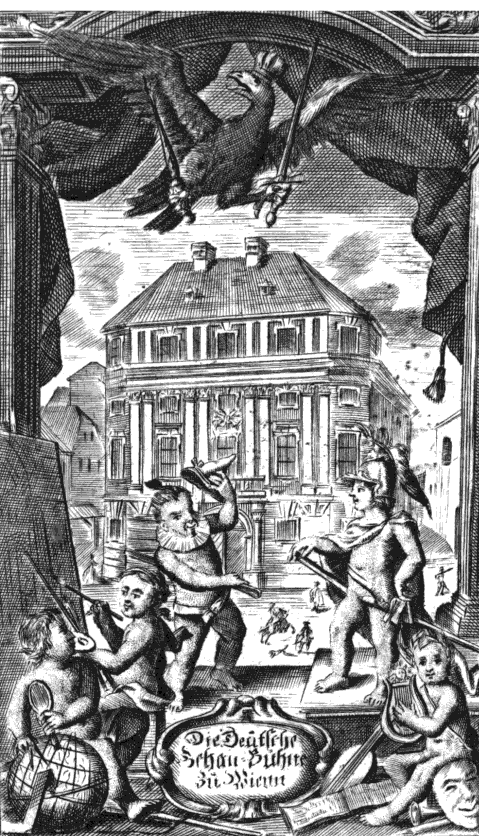
Kärntnertor-Theater as "Deutsche Schau-Bühne zu Wienn" in the 18th century

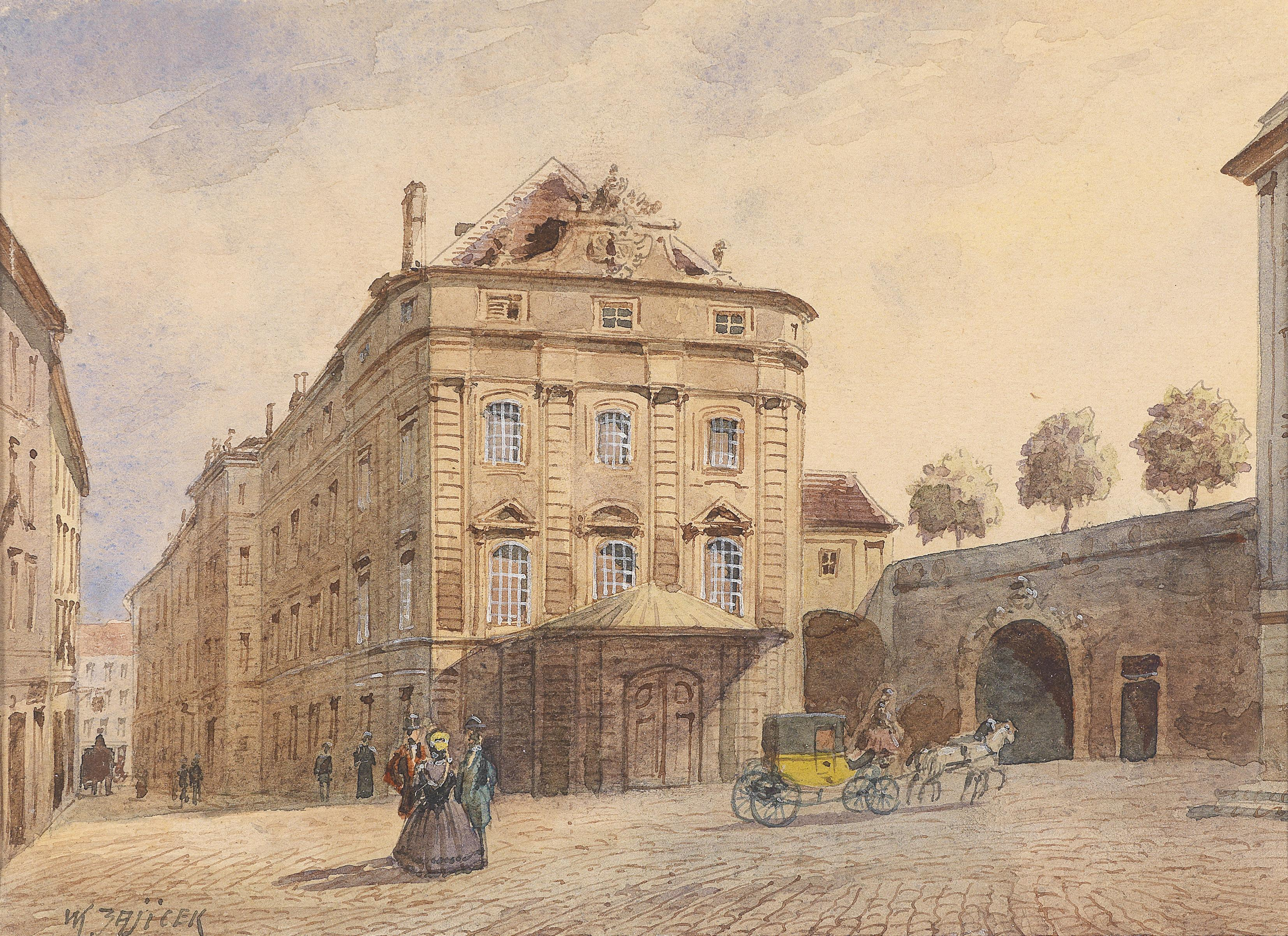
Theater am Kärntnertor

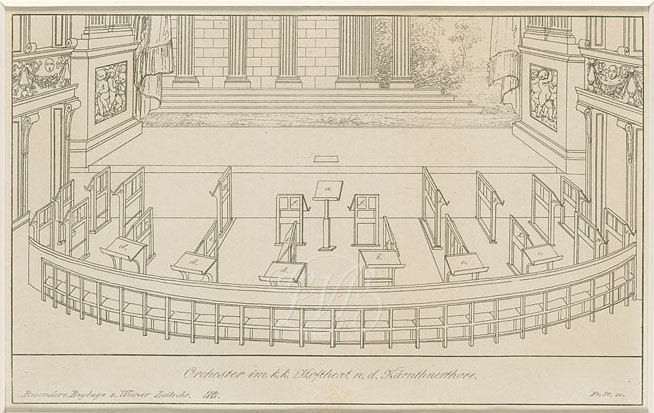
Franz Xaver Stöber: The orchestra in the Kärntnertor-Theater, Wiener Zeitschrift für Kunst, Literatur, Theater und Mode (1821)

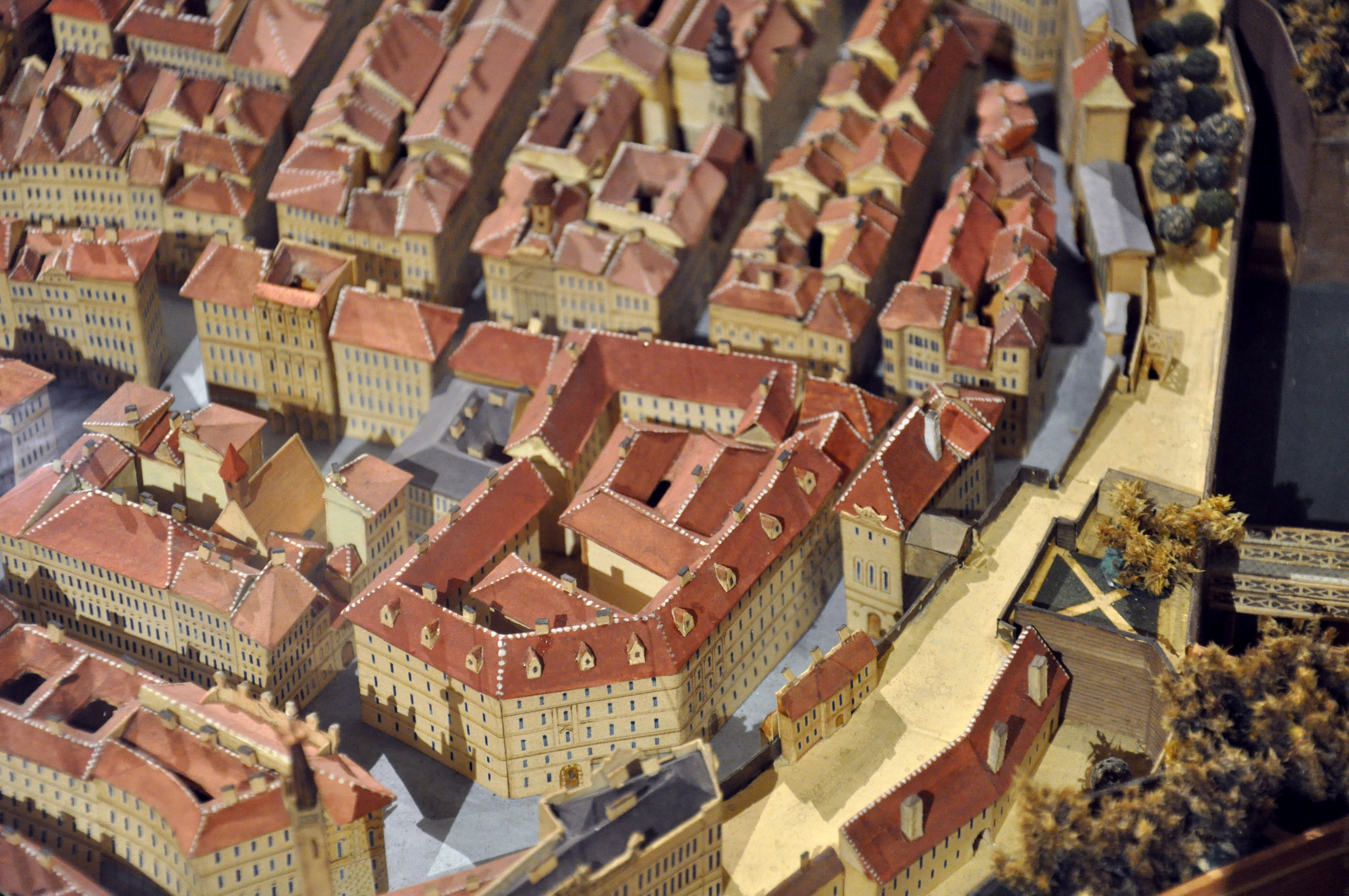
Kärntnertortheater in Vienna (right)

Theater am Kärntnertor or Kärntnertortheater (Carinthian Gate Theatre) was a prestigious theatre in Vienna during the eighteenth and nineteenth centuries. Its official title was Kaiserliches und Königliches Hoftheater zu Wien (Imperial and Royal Court Theatre of Vienna).

== History ==
The theatre was built in 1709 to designs by Antonio Beduzzi on a site near the former Kärntnertor, on the grounds of the present Hotel Sacher. The expenses of building the theatre were borne by the City of Vienna, and it was intended (as Eva Badura-Skoda notes) to be "frequented by the Viennese population of all classes". However, at the command of the emperor, the first performances were of Italian operas, an elite form of entertainment. In 1711, the theatre was redirected to its original purpose when it was placed under the direction of Josef Stranitzky, who put on a variety of entertainment, often embodying a German version of the Italian commedia dell'arte. The theatre was managed by Stranitzky's widow after his death.

In 1728, court artists Borosini and Selliers, who had performed intermezzi in both German and Italian, became the Kärntnertortheater's directors. From 1742 to 1750, the theatre was leased to Selliers alone. In 1752, however, Maria Theresa withdrew the imperial privilege, placing the theatre under the direct scrutiny of the magistrates of Vienna.

The first theatre burned in 1761 and was rebuilt by court architect Nicolò Pacassi; two years later it reopened, again under protective privilege, as the Kaiserliches und Königliches Hoftheater zu Wien (Imperial and Royal Court Theatre of Vienna). From the early nineteenth century, ballets were added to the repertory, as well as Italian and German operas. From 1811 to 1814, Ignaz Franz Castelli served as Hoftheaterdichter (poet of the court theatre). From 1821, the Italian impresario Domenico Barbaia added the venue to the string of theatres under his management and presented Italian operas.

=== Replacement ===
Beginning in 1861, the Vienna Court Opera House (now the Vienna State Opera) was built on the adjoining grounds. It was completed in 1869, and in 1870, the former theatre was razed, making way for the apartment building that became the Hotel Sacher. Gerhard Bronner's cabaret stadtTheater walfischgasse used the name Neues Theater am Kärntnertor (New Theatre at the Kärntnertor) from 1959 to 1973, before adopting its present name.

== First performances of operas and other works ==
During its heyday, several composers conducted the theatre orchestra, including the young Franz Lachner and Ferdinando Paer.

- 1753 (perhaps 1751): Der krumme Teufel (The Lame Devil), a comic opera by the young Joseph Haydn, now lost, that established his early reputation
- 1764 (18 October): L'olimpiade by Florian Leopold Gassmann
- 1766 (25 May): Il viaggiatore ridicolo by Florian Leopold Gassmann
- 1772 (21 October): La secchia rapita by Antonio Salieri
- 1774 (4 April): Thamos, King of Egypt, a play by Tobias Philipp, Baron von Gebler, with music by Wolfgang Amadeus Mozart
- 1787 (7 March): Mozart's Piano Concerto No. 25 in C, K. 503
- 1795 (14 October): Palmira, regina di Persia by Antonio Salieri
- 1799 (3 January): Falstaff by Antonio Salieri
- 1799 (28 February): Camilla by Ferdinando Paer
- 1799 (12 July): Il morto vivo by Ferdinando Paer
- 1800 (2 June): Cesare in Farmacusa by Antonio Salieri
- 1800 (2 September): Ginevra degli Almieri by Ferdinando Paer
- 1800 (22 October): L'Angiolina by Antonio Salieri
- 1800 (18 December): Poche ma buone by Ferdinando Paer
- 1801 (6 June): Achille by Ferdinando Paer
- 1814 (23 May): Fidelio (final version as performed today) by Ludwig van Beethoven
- 1821 (7 March): Franz Schubert's song "Erlkönig"
- 1822 (4 December): Libussa by Conradin Kreutzer
- 1823 (25 October): Euryanthe by Carl Maria von Weber
- 1824 (7 May): Beethoven's Ninth Symphony
- 1829 (11 August): The Viennese début as pianist of Frédéric Chopin
- 1837 (9 March): Das Nachtlager in Granada (second version with recitatives) by Conradin Kreutzer
- 1842 (19 May): Linda di Chamounix by Gaetano Donizetti
- 1843 (5 June): Maria di Rohan by Gaetano Donizetti
- 1844 (3 February): Die Heimkehr des Verbannten by Otto Nicolai
- 1845 (13 November): Dom Sébastien (revised version) by Gaetano Donizetti
- 1845 (20 December): Der Tempelritter by Otto Nicolai
- 1847 (25 November): Martha by Friedrich von Flotow
- 1864 (4 February): Die Rheinnixen (Les Fées du Rhin) by Jacques Offenbach
