= Glass instrument =

Musical instruments made mainly of glass

This family of musical instruments (also called crystallophones) includes those whose primary material is glass. They may be played using percussive techniques, such as striking the glass to produce a sound, or by utilizing friction to generate a resonant sound (a playing technique used for friction idiophones). Many glass instruments produce an ethereal, otherworldly timbre. A well-known glass instrument is Ben Franklin's glass harmonica.

== History ==
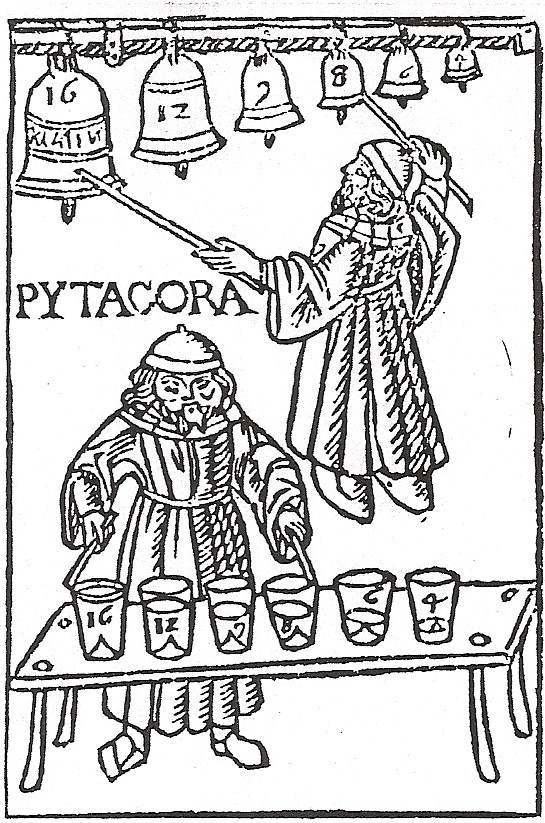
Depiction of the glass harp being played, Milan, 1492

=== First glass instruments ===
Historical records suggest that early versions of glass and porcelain instruments were first developed around the 14th century in China, Japan, and Persia. An encyclopedia of Chinese instruments in 1300 A.D. mentions an instrument consisting of "nine cups, struck with a stick". Similar musical bowls were recorded in Japan, taking the form of a porcelain gong, and in Persia as a set of earthenware water-filled cups which were tapped to produce notes. These percussive instruments spread to Europe in the following centuries, but they may also have developed independently. Records published at Milan in 1492 contain a woodcut depicting playing glasses as part of an experiment, and an inventory of the Kunsthistorisches Museum in Vienna compiled in 1596 includes descriptions of a glasswork instrument with various octaves and semitones. Publications in 1677 describe using a wet finger to create resonant sounds by stroking the rim of eight glasses with various quantities of wine or other liquids, described as "making cheerful wine music". The music produced by different liquids of the glasses was thought to correspond to emotions relating to the four "humours" of the body, and even was attributed to curing various medical conditions such as "thickness of the blood". These descriptions resemble what is now known as the glass harp, an instrument consisting of various wine glasses filled with water to varying amounts and played by running a wet finger along the rim.

=== Popularization in the 18th century ===
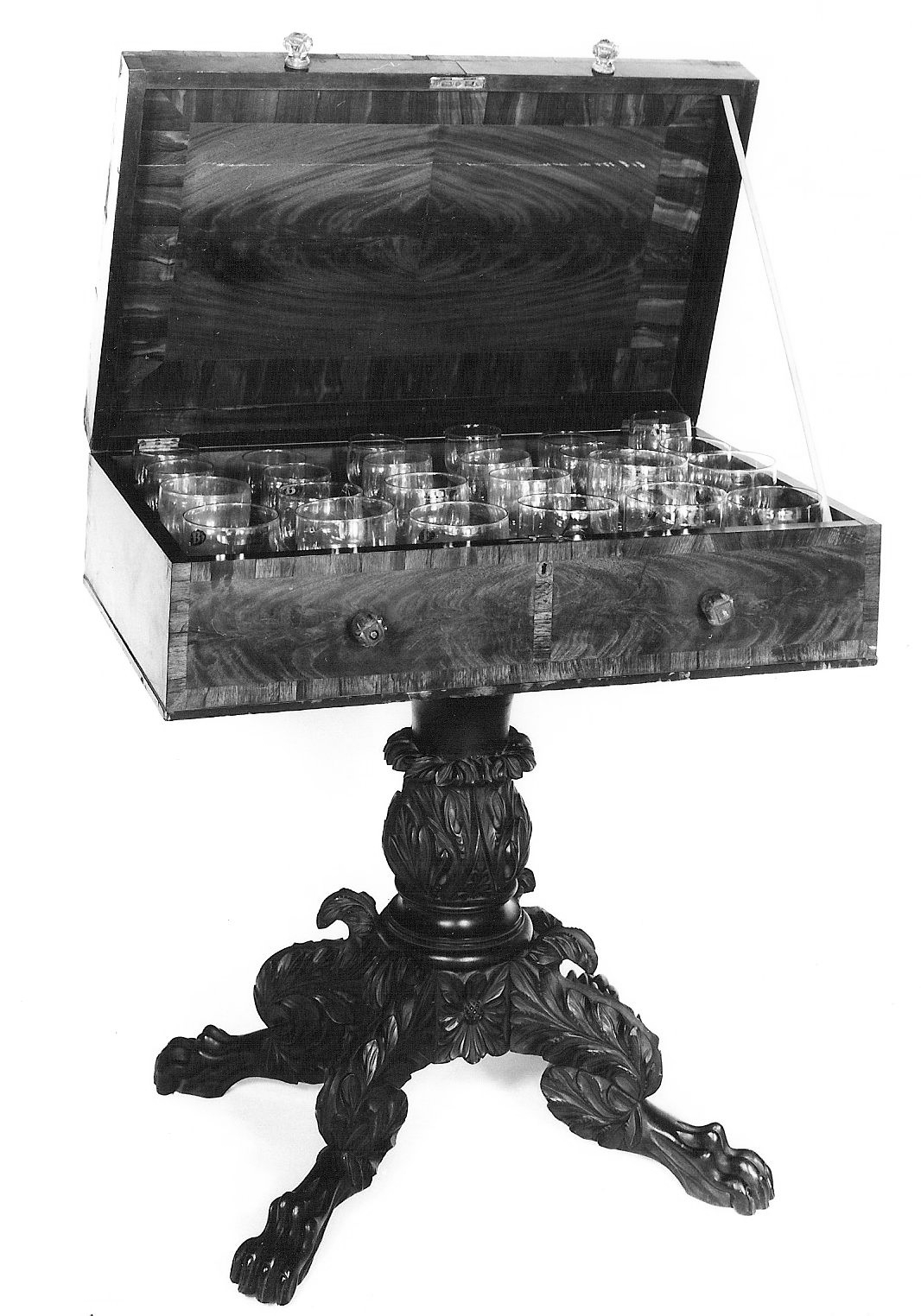
19th century glass harp

The earliest instance of a glass instrument being used in concert music was noted in 1732, with records stating that a series of partially-filled wine glasses were tapped with a muffled stick to perform concertos with supporting instrumentation from bass and violins. Instructions on how to construct a glass harp, referred in a text by the French name Verrillon, were included in a 1738 text published from Germany.

The invention of the glass harp is often attributed to Richard Pockrich, an Irish inventor who popularized the instrument in 1741. His invention, which he referred to as an "angelic organ," consisted of large glass bells which he would strike with a muffled stick and may have later played by running a moist finger along their rims. He popularized the instrument by going on tour in England and Ireland and performing famous pieces such as Handel's Water Music. In 1759, both Pockrich and his angelic organ were destroyed in a fire while staying in London. Performances using the glass harp grew in popularity in the following decades, accompanied by publications on instruction, maintenance, and repertoire.

In 1763, Benjamin Franklin applied the principles behind the glass harp to invent his own glass instrument, the glass harmonica. This instrument places the glass bowls horizontally along a rotating axis. The glasses were originally kept wet by a sponge, but later improvements to the invention by other inventors redesigned the instrument so that the bowls rested in a trough of water, ensuring that their surface is always moist and improving tonal quality and ease of play. The player may rotate the bowls using a treadle operated by their foot, and rest their hands along the bowls to produce a ringing sound. Popularized by its ethereal sound, over 100 composers wrote works to feature this instrument.

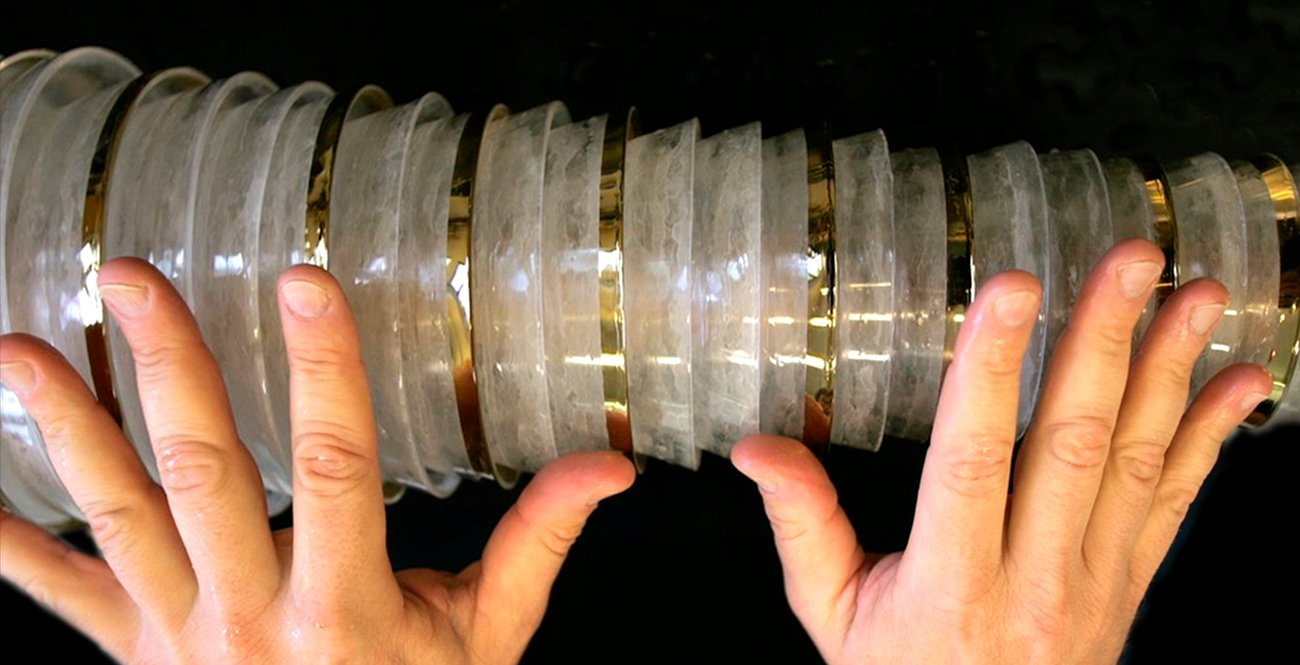
Small glass harmonica

The glass harmonica grew very popular in Germany, and is attributed to supporting the romanticism movement in the late 18th century. By 1830, however, the popularity of the glass harmonica declined. The glass harp continued to have widespread popularity in England, in part due to its ease of accessibility compared to the glass harmonica.

The glass dulcimer was also performed during this time. Accounts of this instrument, similar in design to a glass harmonica but struck with soft mallets instead of rubbing with ones hands, appear in books and plays around the 1770s. It is possible this is the same instrument as the glasschord, an instrument consisting of glass bars struck by padded hammers which would be activated by a keyboard, similar to a celesta.

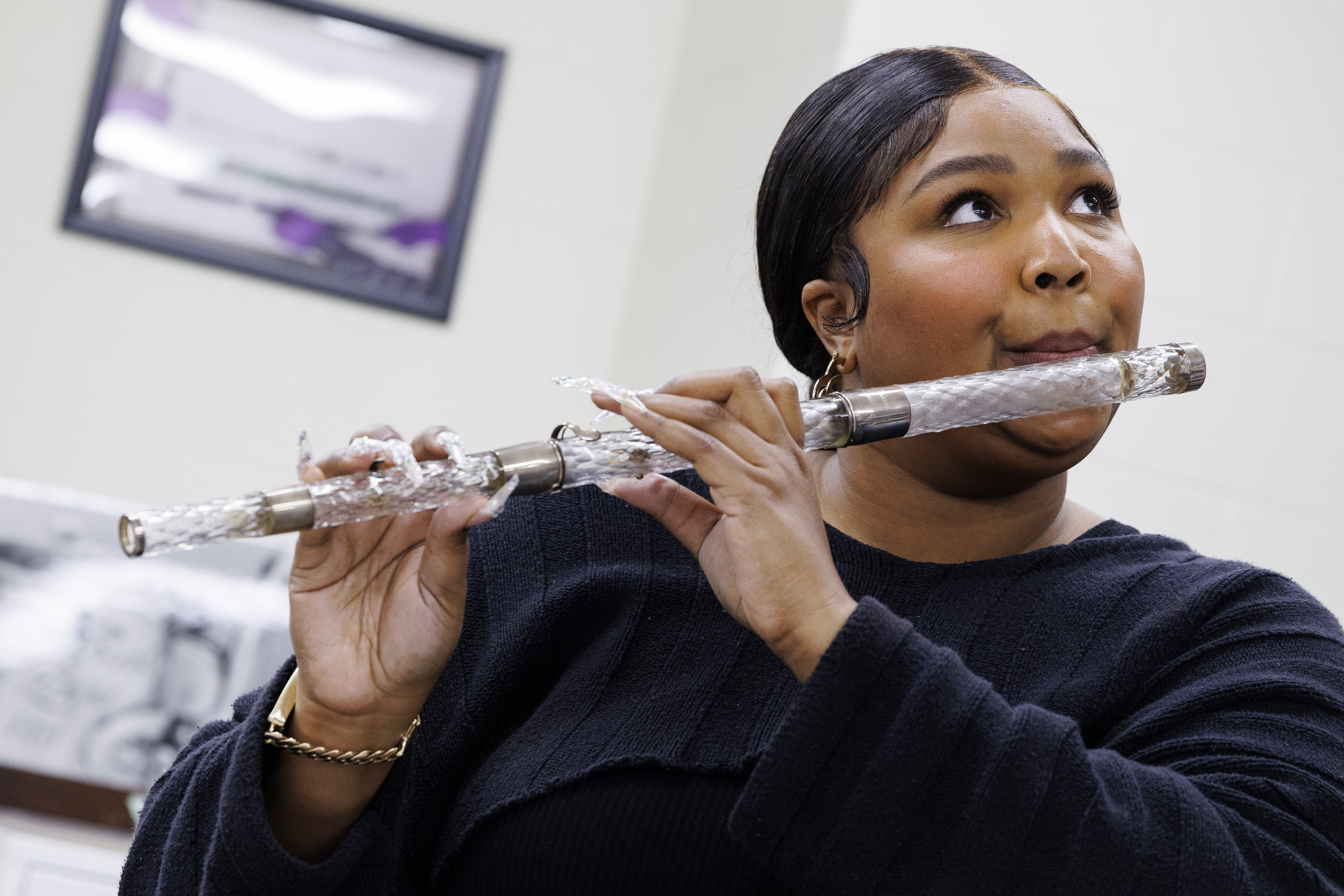
Lizzo playing a Laurent crystal flute

The glass flute (or crystal flute) was patented in 1806 in France by Claude Laurent. These crystal flutes grew in popularity and were owned by emperors, kings, and heads of state, including James Madison. Only 185 of Laurent's glass flutes have survived to the modern day.

=== Post-18th century and modern ===
While records of glass instruments persist into the 20th century, evidence indicates that their general popularity and performances declined past the 1850s. Nowadays, glass instruments are used in compositions looking to capture an ethereal atmosphere. Some famous examples include using the glass harmonica in the 1982 film Star Trek II: The Wrath of Khan, as well as Marco Beltrami's film scores for The Minus Man (1999) and The Faculty (1998).

The Library of Congress invited the singer Lizzo to play a crystal flute from their collection in September 2022.

Various modern glassblowers, instrumentalists, and performers have invented and utilized contemporary glass instruments. Some examples include:

- Glass marimba, utilized by the Brazilian percussion ensemble, Uakti
- Verrophone, invented in 1983 by Sascha Reckert
- Cristal Baschet, invented in 1952 by the brothers Bernard and François Baschet

== Acoustics and functionality ==
Glass instruments are typically played as either percussion instruments or friction idiophones, with a few exceptions such as the crystal flute and glass violin.

=== Percussion ===
When played using percussive techniques, the exposed glass would be struck with a mallet, finger, or hammer to produce a sound. Due to the fragility of glass as a material, the hammers or mallets used are often dampened with cloth or other material to mitigate the risk of fracturing the instruments. The glass may also be rubbed with the mallet to produce sound.

=== Friction idiophones ===
Friction idiophones produce sound by being rubbed or scraped with a non-sounding object. In the case of glass instruments, the glass is often rubbed with a moistened finger to gradually draw out a note. In the example of the glass harp, "as the player's finger moves around the rim of the glass, the nodes and antinodes move with it, resulting in a pulsating sound."

== List of glass instruments ==
Instrument	Origins	Description	Image
Glass harp (musical glasses, singing glasses, angelic organ, verrillon, ghost fiddle, seraphim)	14th century; 1741, Richard Pockrich	Cups or wine glasses are filled with varying levels of water. The glasses may either be struck with a dampened stick to produce a percussive sound, or a player may moisten their fingers and rub the rims of the glasses to produce a sound.	Robert Tiso playing a glass harp
Glass harmonica (glass armonica, glass harmonium, bowl organ, hydrocrystalophone)	1763, Benjamin Franklin	Glass bowls of decreasing sizes are set on a horizontal axis that may be rotated with a treadle operated by the player's foot. The bowls rest in a trough filled with water that keeps their surface wet. The player gently rubs their fingers against the wet bowls to produce a sound. The pitch of the sound depends upon the size of the bowl being played.	Unterlinden glass harmonica
Glasschord (sticcado, possibly glass dulcimer)	Various records 18th century, possibly Benjamin Franklin	Rows of glass bars of varying length may be struck by dampened hammers to produce a sound. The hammers are activated using a keyboard similar to that of a celesta. Mozart composed pieces for this instrument in 1791.	Glasschord, 1786
Euphone (historical)	1790, Ernst Florens Friedrich Chladni	Rows of glass bars of varying length are struck and played to generate different tones. Discussed in Chladni's Entdeckungen über die Theorie des Klanges.	Chladni's euphone, 1790
Crystal flute (glass flute)	1806, Claude Laurent	A playable flute made from glass. Most of the flutes are made from potash glass. True "crystal" flutes, which are made from high-leaded glass, are exceptionally rare.	Glass flute, Claude Laurent, Paris, 1811. Museum of Musical Instruments, University of Leipzig
Crystal baschet	1952, brothers Bernard and François Baschet	Metal rods are embedded in a heavy plate to form the elements. Each metal rod is accompanied by an attached glass rod. The metal rod's length, weight and position at the equilibrium point determine the sound's pitch. The glass rod is gently stroked with a wet finger to produce sound.	Crystal baschet
Verrophone	1983, Sascha Reckert	Open-ended glass tubes are arranged in order of increasing size, often in a chromatic scale of increasing pitch similar to the pipes of an organ. Sound is produced by rubbing the ends of the tubes or by striking or rubbing them with a padded mallet. Multiple notes may be played at once due to the close proximity of the tubes.	
Glass marimba	Unknown, contemporary	Glass keys of varying sizes are aligned over either a single open top box or individual resonators for each key. A soft mallet strikes the keys to produce a sound, similar to a xylophone. Different mallet types can bring out different effects. Glass marimbas are used by the Brazilian percussion ensemble, Uakti.	Glass marimba (from Emil Richards Collection)
Glass violin (Hirom glass violin)	2000s, Hario Glass Company (Japan)	Made out of a single piece of hardened borosilicate glass, a glass violin plays just like a regular violin. The company has also produced other glass versions of popular instruments, including the Chinese harp, a cello, and a "bamboo" flute.	A glass violin being played
Euphone (modern)	Unknown, contemporary	Glass rods are stroked by hand, triggering tuning rods and metal or fiberglass amplifying resonators. The result is a bell-like resonance. The instrument is a newer and more musical incarnation of the famous Cristal Baschet.	
