= Brockhill =

Brockhill may refer to:

== People ==
- Thomas Brockhill, member of Parliament for Kent from 1382 to 1402 in the House of Commons of England
- Brockhill Taylor, member of Parliament for Cavan Borough from 1634 to 1635 in the Irish House of Commons
- Brockhill Newburgh, member of Parliament for Cavan County from 1715 to 1727 in the Irish House of Commons

== Places ==
- Brockhill Country Park, a country park located in Kent, England
- Brockhill (HM Prison), a Young Offenders Institution at the Hewell Grange complex in Worcestershire, England
- Brockhill, Berkshire, a village in the civil parish of Winkfield, Berkshire, England
- Brockhill, Scottish Borders, a United Kingdom location
