= Brighton Bottle Orchestra =

English band

The Brighton Bottle Orchestra was a four-member band based in Brighton, England, which toured nationwide playing classical musical tunes on bottles for comic effect. Similar to a glass harmonica or a glass harp, the bottles were filled with different amounts of water to tune them and they were played by blowing across the rims of the bottles which were arranged similar to the tubes of a pan flute. Members of the orchestra included Peter Miller and Terry Garoghan.

== Comic effect ==
The comic effect is made by trying to get complicated tunes out of a fairly simple musical instrument; it was a standard act in music halls and was often given overcomplicated Latin or Greek names for enticement.
