= Richard Pockrich =

Richard Pockrich may refer to:

- Richard Pockrich (inventor) (c. 1695–1759), inventor of the angelic organ in 1741
- Richard Pockrich (MP) (c. 1666–1719), Irish landowner, military commander and Member of Parliament
