= Ann Thicknesse =

English musician and singer (1737–1824)

Anne Thicknesse
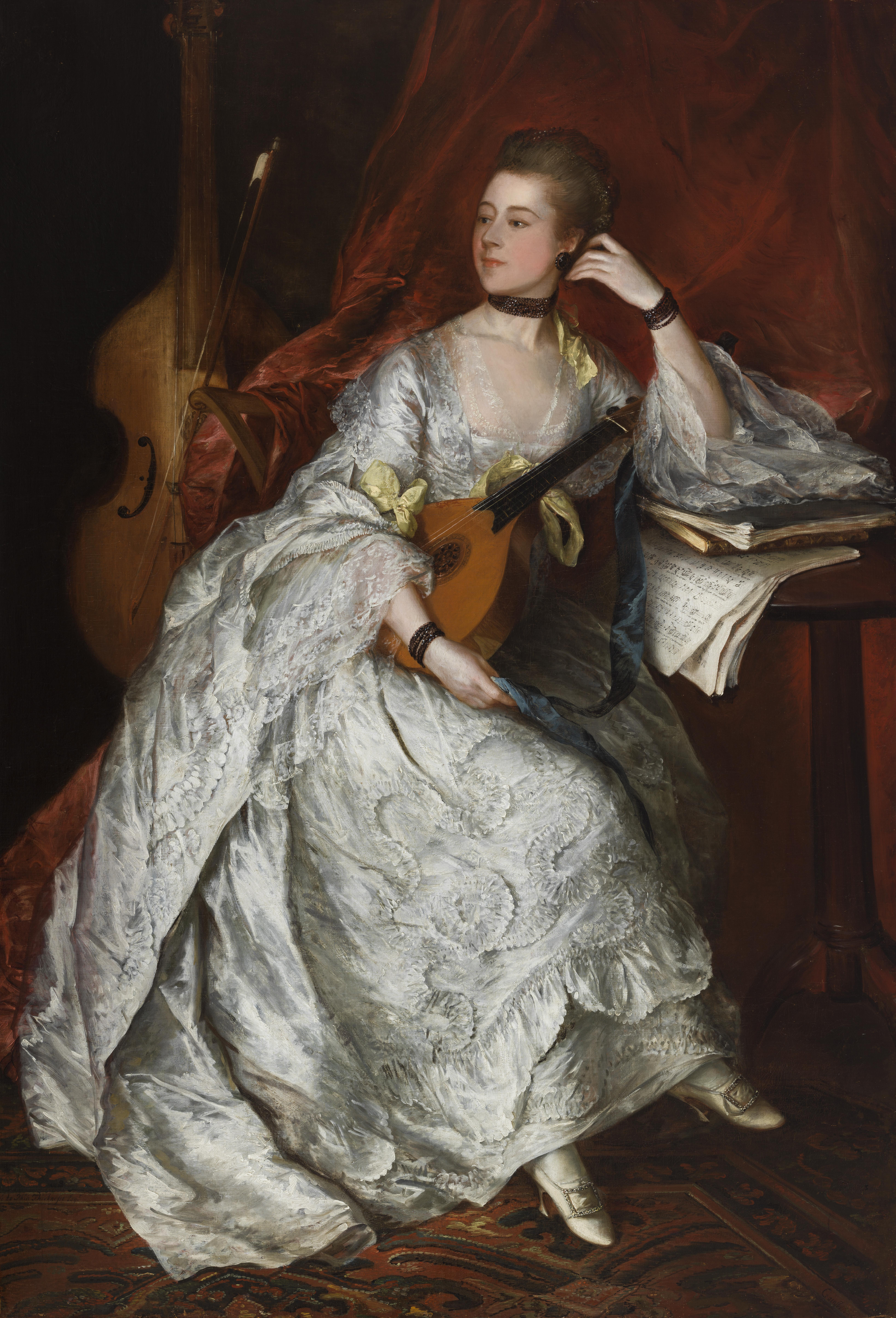
- Portrait of Ann Ford by Thomas Gainsborough, 1760

Background information
- Also known as: Mrs. Philip Thicknesse
- Born: 22 February 1737; London, England
- Died: 20 January 1824 (aged 86)
- Occupations: Musician and singer
- Instruments: English guitar, viola da gamba, musical glasses

Anne or Ann Ford, or Ann Thicknesse (Mrs Philip Thicknesse, 22 February 1737 – 20 January 1824) was an 18th-century English musician and singer, famous in her time for a scandal that attended her struggle to perform in public.

== Life and music ==
Ford was born on 22 February 1737 in London. Her father, who worked in the law courts, claimed to have spent hundreds of pounds on her education which included private lessons by the celebrated actor and singer Susanna Cibber and elocution lessons by Thomas Sheridan. She gained more education than most as she had a knowledge of five foreign languages and she played several fretted string instruments, including the lute-like English guitar and the viola da gamba, comparable to a modern cello. She performed with others giving Sunday concerts at her house, although her father, Thomas Ford, refused to allow her to perform publicly. She was a singer with a beautiful voice by her early twenties, but her earliest attempts to appear in public venues were unsuccessful; her father went so far as to have her arrested twice to prevent her escaping his control. Eventually she made a successful escape, and held her first public subscription concert on 18 March 1760. She would play the gamba with it lying on its side rather than playing it between her legs.

She performed a series of subsequent concerts, including daily performances from 24 October to 30 October of that year, although it was considered controversial for a woman to play the "masculine" viola da gamba, referred to at the time as the viol di gambo.

Ford gave a performance at Spring Gardens in 1761, "English airs", accompanying herself on the musical glasses. She also wrote a published work, Instructions for Playing on the Musical Glasses. The instrument was comparable to the glass harp of Richard Pockrich consisting of individual glass goblets tuned with water, and preceded the 1761 mechanized armonica (glass harmonica) invention of Benjamin Franklin and played by Marianne Davies.

Ford's accomplishments risked being complicated by an infatuated lover, the Earl of Jersey, who offered her £800 a year to be his mistress. When she refused, Lord Jersey tried to sabotage her initial public concert, but she earned £15 from it nonetheless. In 1761, she published a pamphlet, A Letter from Miss F—d to a Person of Distinction, defending her position. This in turn provoked a pamphlet from the Earl, A Letter to Miss F–d. The brief pamphlet war between them differed in subject and tone from others conducted in that era.

== Later life ==
On 27 September 1762, she became the third wife of Philip Thicknesse, thereby gaining higher social standing. They had a son who became Captain John Thicknesse RN (c. 1763–1846).

She and her husband were travelling to Italy in 1792, during the Reign of Terror in the French Revolution, when Thicknesse died suddenly in Boulogne. Anne was arrested as a foreigner and imprisoned. After the execution of Maximilien Robespierre in July 1794, she was released under a general pardon for all prisoners who could prove that they could earn their living; her profession stood her in good stead.

In 1800, Ford published an autobiographical roman à clef entitled The School for Fashion by Anne Thicknesse, which included many public figures of the day in thin disguise. She herself featured as Euterpe. She discussed issues including the choices facing a woman which included being a mistress. Her Euterpe not that moral issues were important - unless you were in the highest social class. This was one of the last "School for?" books and it was similar in content to the noted play "School for Scandal".

Her portrait was painted by Thomas Gainsborough in 1760. It was said to be un-ladylike because she had her legs crossed (like a man).
