= Keyboard harmonica =

The keyboard harmonica may refer to several different musical instruments:

- Glasschord, a crystallophone that uses a keyboard mechanism to strike small glass plates
- Glass harmonica, refers to a variation of the glass harmonica that uses a keyboard to trigger small pads that press against the bowls
- Melodica, a free reed instrument outfitted with a keyboard layout
