= Dean Shostak =

American crystallophone player and violinist

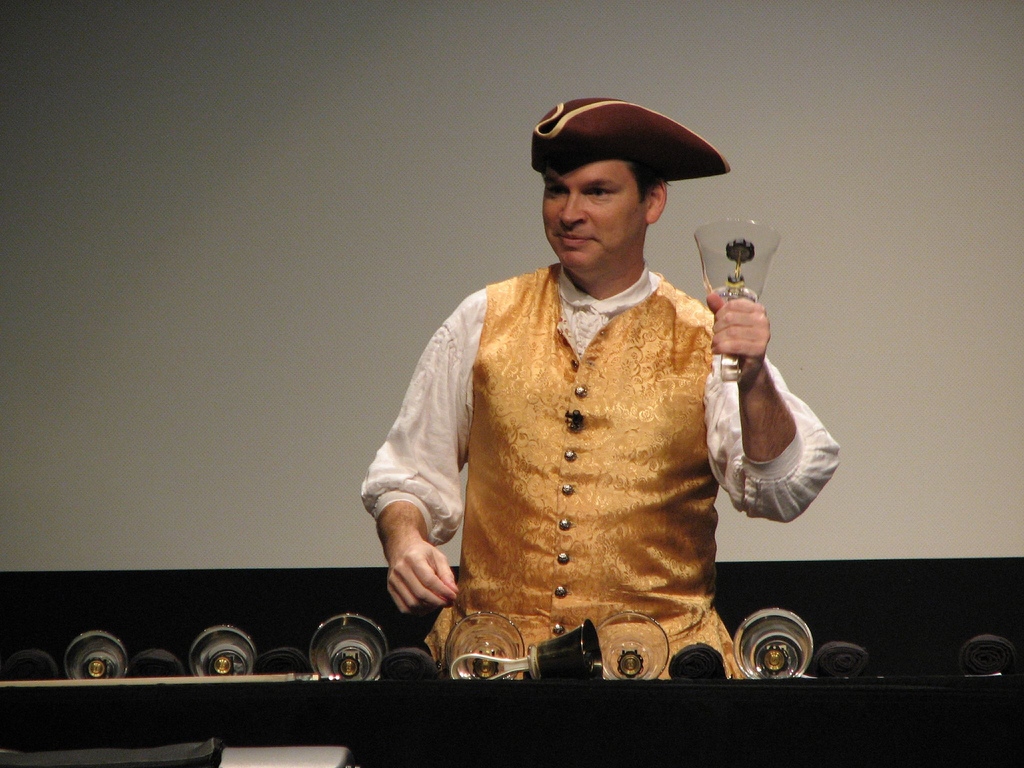
- Dean Shostak playing his glass handbells.

Background information
- Origin: Williamsburg, Virginia, United States
- Instrument: Crystallophone
- Website: www.crystalconcert.com

Dean Shostak is an American crystallophone-player and violinist. He regularly performs his Crystal Concerts which consist of music played on his glass instruments, such as the glass violin, the glass armonica, and the crystal handbells.

== Personal life ==
Shostak began performing at age 14 in Colonial Williamsburg in the Music Teacher's Shop. He earned a B.A. in music from the University of Virginia and learned to play the pocket or kit violin and the hurdy-gurdy. In 1991 he became involved in the revival of the glass armonica. He has performed throughout the United States and his music has been featured in notable programs such as NPR's All Things Considered, BBC's Good Morning Television, and Mister Rogers' Neighborhood. He has also written original scores for films for the National Park Service, City of Chattanooga, State of Tennessee, and the Norfolk Botanical Garden. Shostak currently lives in Williamsburg, Virginia with his wife Valerie, and they have two daughters, and one son.

== Discography ==
- Crystal Carols (1994)
- Crystal Christmas (1995)
- Celtic Crystal (1997)
- Colonial Fair (1999)
- Davy Crockett's Fiddle (2002)
- 18th Century Mother Goose Songs (2002)
- The Glass Armonica (2004)
- Crystal Christmas (2005)
- World of Glass (2008)
- Crystal Carols 1 and 2 (2010)

== Instruments ==
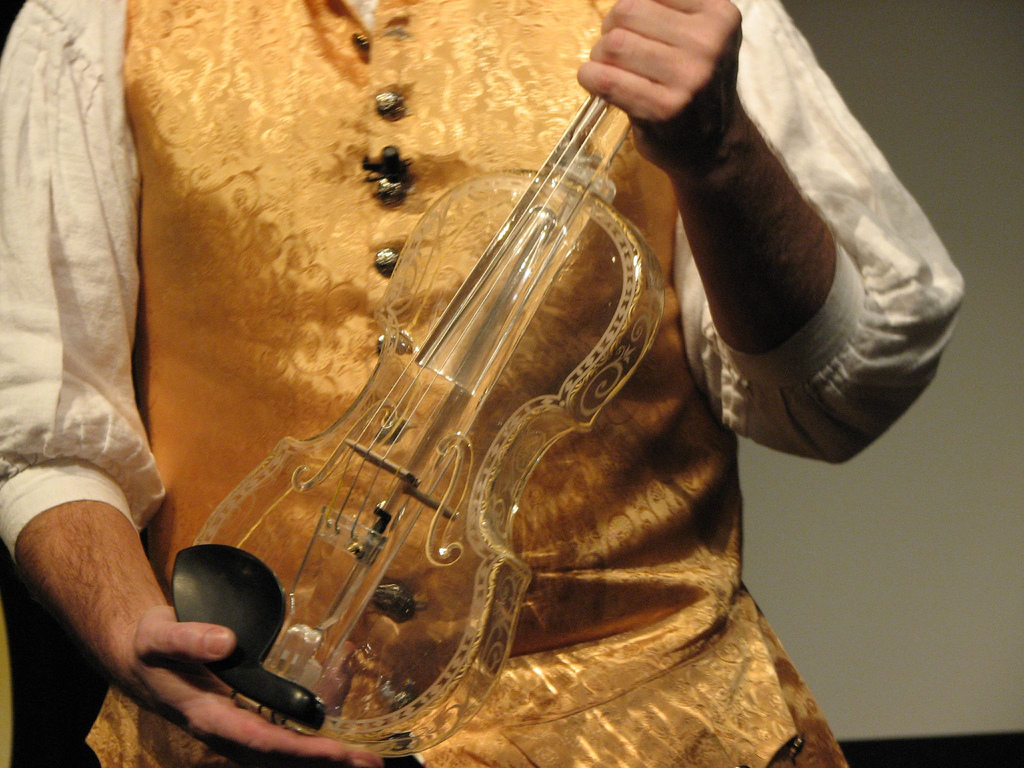
Glass violin

- Glass armonica: Shostak is one of only eight glass armonica players in the world.
- Glass violin: Shostak owns one of only two glass violins in the world-the other belongs to Ikuko Kawai. The violin was created for him by the Hario Corporation.
- Cristal Baschet: Shostak plays one of only two cristal baschets in the United States.
- Crystal Handbells: Shostak worked with Malmark Handbell Company in Pennsylvania, which provided the handles and clappers for the bells, and also with Thomas Hession, who created the glass bells, to create the first glass English handbells.
- Glass Bowed Psaltery: Jim Doble created the instrument at Shostak's request.
- Grand Harmonicon (Glass harp): Shostak acquired this instrument at an auction; it has survived since the 1820s.
