= Harmonika =

Harmonica (or the German equivalent Harmonika) can refer to:

- Harmonica, free-reed aerophone (G. Mundharmonika)
- Glass harmonica, glass ideophone (G. Glasharmonika)
- Accordion, keyboard aerophone (G. Handharmonika)
