= Producing Great Sound for Film and Video =

Filmmaking handbook by Jay Rose

Producing Great Sound for Film and Video: Expert Tips from Preproduction to Final Mix
- 4th Edition
- Author: Jay Rose
- Language: English
- Release number: 4th Edition
- Subject: Filmmaking, Audio Production, Audio Mixing
- Published: July 17, 2014
- Publisher: Focal Press
- Publication place: United States
- ISBN: 978-0415722070

Producing Great Sound for Film and Video: Expert Tips from Preproduction to Final Mix is a non-fiction, filmmaking handbook. It covers the process of acquiring quality sound for motion picture productions.

Author Jay Rose is an Emmy-award winning sound professional. He has won over 150 major awards including 12 Clios, and he has contributed to nearly 15,000 commercials. His work includes the MGM release Two Weeks.

The book is published by Focal Press, a media and technology publishing company. Focal Press is an imprint of the academic press Taylor & Francis.

The book was first published in 1999 under the title Producing Great Sound for Digital Video by Miller Freeman Books and was 375 pages. Seventeen years later, as of 2016, the book is in its fourth edition, and stands at 520 pages.

It has been a part of required reading at many film schools, including the University of Southern California (USC).

The book was also awarded five out of five stars by Videomaker Magazine.

When released, Millimeter Magazine noted that the book was one of very few publications extensively covering the art of capturing motion picture sound.

Producing Great Sound for Film and Video has been called, "...the book on the subject."

== Overview ==
Producing Great Sound for Film and Video is broken into four main sections, ordered to reflect real-world filming situations:

- Audio Basics
- Planning and Pre-Production
- Production Sound
- Postproduction

Subjects covered include analog versus digital audio, recording and using sound effects, microphone techniques, ADR, mixing, and mastering.

One section highlighted as unique by Videomaker Magazine was that on "editing voices." Rose breaks down how human speech works, and how that translates to film and video productions. Tips include stealing unvoiced sounds from other characters, or people speaking in a scene, and using them to replace problematic recordings of others. The "editing voices" section also discusses sounds with "hard attacks" and training the ear to hear phonemes, which helps in isolating and correcting speech recording issues.

Numerous "recipes" for dealing with common sound issues, such as reducing or eliminating echo on sets, and removing line hum and buzz from recorded audio, are also provided.

Eliva Silva writing for San Antonio Express-News said of the book:

[It is] the whole theory -- and beautiful theory -- on the science of audio and the way that audio is recorded through voltage, converted into digital information, back to voltage into sound.

== Style ==
Author Rose states in the book that he wishes to appeal to technical and non-technical people alike, adding he hopes to keep the book approachable and conversational in tone, dispelling the idea that audio needs to be difficult to understand. He states that audio is not "rocket science." While the book does contain math and science, Rose points out the math is at an elementary school level and the physics is "common sense."

The current version of the book provides downloadable files including sample sounds and music, diagnostic tools and additional tutorials allowing the reader to practice with the principles explained. Earlier versions of the book included a CD-ROM of similar assets.

In 2003, Millimeter Magazine wrote about the book:

Digital artists are very much hands-on, and Rose is the right man to write audio books for this new generation of filmmakers. Rose operates his own boutique sound studio and bridges the analog and digital eras - he's made the discoveries and mistakes that no one should have to learn on the job. This direct experience with DV equipment and projects is apparent throughout the book.

== Classroom use ==
Major universities and film schools that have used the book as a textbook include:

- University of Southern California (USC)
- UCLA Extension
- Long Island University
- Wichita State University
- Fredonia State University of New York
- California State University, Northridge

A 33-page instructor guide is also provided by the publisher.

== Reception ==
=== Critical reviews ===
Covering the first edition of the book, Videomaker Magazine noted the high price tag of the book, but said:

With PBS and Turner Network Television production experience under his belt, author Jay Rose brings a wealth of experience to Producing Great Sound for Digital Video...the book is replete with facts and useful information.

Of the second edition, Millimeter Magazine said:

Shortchanging film sound is typical of new filmmakers, and the emphasis on picture over sound is a bias running through film schools and film publications - articles, books, and courses on visual subjects far outnumber those on film sound. Author Jay Rose is single-handedly addressing the problem.

John Hartney writing for Creative COW said of the second edition,

...it offers such a wide range of usable information about hands-on digital audio production, that by reading it, the reader is empowered with production skills and enlightened by an appreciation of how the experience of audio enriches video.

In 2008, covering the third edition of the book, Videomaker Magazine awarded it "five out of five stars" and said:

I have been looking for this book for 20 years - no exaggeration...The chapter on Editing Voices alone is worth the price tag.

=== Entertainment industry reviews ===
Academy Award winner Randy Thom (director of Sound Design at Skywalker Sound, Oscar winner for The Right Stuff and The Incredibles) wrote praise of the author and book:

Jay Rose is one of the leaders in spreading the gospel of using sound creatively. He presents cutting-edge ideas about the collaboration of sound and image, and also covers the basics… all in an easy to read, easy to understand style.

Academy Award nominated sound mixer Jeff Wexler (Independence Day, The Last Samurai, Fight Club) wrote a blurb for the book stating:

"This is the definitive book. It should be mandatory reading for anyone who is seriously considering a career making movies."
