= Richard Pockrich (MP) =

Richard Pockrich (c. 1666 – 1719) was an Irish landowner, military commander and Member of Parliament.

== Career ==
He raised and commanded an independent company during the Williamite wars and was wounded at the siege of Athlone in 1690. He represented Monaghan Borough in the Irish House of Commons from 1713 to 1714. The family estate was at Derrylusk, Co. Monaghan, where they had extensive property. When he died his estate was estimated at £1,000 to £4,000 per year.

== Family ==
He married the granddaughter of the Cavan Borough MP Brockhill Taylor and was the father of Richard Pockrich, the inventor of the Angelic organ. Another son, Newburgh, married the daughter of Cavan Borough MP Brockhill Newburgh.

Parliament of Ireland
Preceded by Sir Alexander Cairnes, 1st Bt; Sir Richard Vernon, 3rd Bt	Member of Parliament for Monaghan Borough; 1713–1714; With: Francis Lucas	Succeeded by Francis Lucas; Hugh Willoughby
