= Stefano Giannotti =

Italian composer and musician (born 1963)

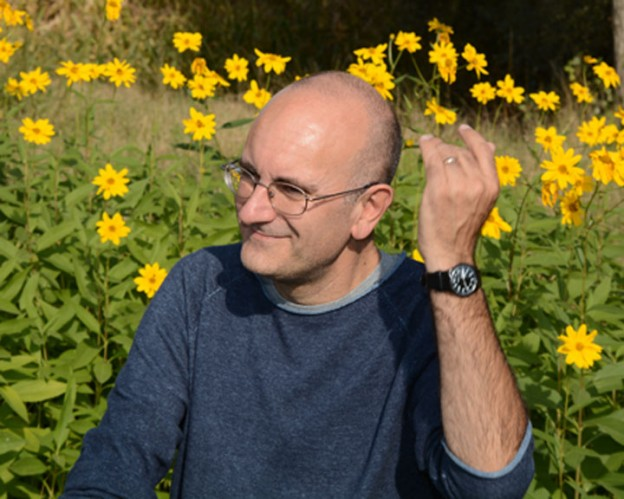

Background information
- Born: 22 March 1963 (age 63); Lucca, Italy
- Origin: Italian
- Occupation: Musician
- Instruments: composer, radio-author, videomaker, guitarist, singer and multi-instrumentalist.
- Years active: 1983–present
- Website: stefanogiannotti.com/en/

Stefano Giannotti (born March 22, 1963, in Lucca) is an Italian composer, radio-author, videomaker, guitarist, singer and multi-instrumentalist.

== Career ==
He was on born March 22, 1963, in Lucca, Italy. He started to play a guitar as a little boy. Stefano graduated master's degree in composition, Istituto Musicale Boccherini in Lucca. He performed with chamber music group Trio Chitarristico Lucchese in several European countries somewhere between 1983 and 1990.

Alvin Curran had an influence his development in radiophonic art. From 1989 Gianotti earned numerous international recognitions for the radiophonic art.

From 1997 he has been collaborating with Italian choreographer Roberto Castelo. Their task were to compose for his performance 64 Variations of Time. The performance premiered on September, and Stefano composed fourteen pieces for her which he named The weather changes (Il tempo cambia).

From 1998 to 2003, he lived in Germany. From 1998 to 1999 he was a guest of the artist program of the DAAD in Berlin. A year later he received an art scholarship at Schloss Wiepersdorf. Because of his great work, he was invited to reside in the famous art house Worpswede from July 2002 to January 2003. With his work Il tempo cambia, he won the Karl Sczuka Preis in 2002. For the second time he got reward in 2007 for his radio piece Geologica.

During 2010 he founded the band OTEME (Osservatorio delle Terre Emerse), which performs his songs and chamber music. Over the years, the group has increasingly taken on the characteristics of a true musical laboratory, which revolves around a stable group of nine instrumentalists, composed of Valeria Marzocchi (flute, piccolo, voice), Nicola Bimbi (oboe, English horn), Lorenzo Del Pecchia (clarinet, bass clarinet), Maicol Pucci (trumpet, flugelhorn), Valentina Cinquini (harp, voice), Emanuela Lari (piano, keyboards, voice), Gabriele Michetti (bass, double bass, voice), Matteo Cammisa (drums, xylophone, timpani), to whom various collaborators are added from time to time to enrich the sound.

He collaborated with internationally renowned artists: Peter Ablinger, Guido Arbonelli, Michael Augustin, Thomas Bloch, Roberto Castello, Enzo Fabiani String Quartet, Hugo Hamilton, Peter Machajdík, Andreas F. Mueller, Harmonia Ensemble, Alan Tschertschessow, Birgit Ramsauer, Fabrizio Desideri, Agata Zubel, etc.

Many of his works have been produced for and in collaboration with: RAI Radio 1, RAI Radio 3, Polskie Radio, Magyar Rádió, ORF, Radio France Culture, Danish Radio, WDR Köln, SFB, Deutschland-Radio Berlin, Saarländischer Rundfunk, Australian Broadcasting Company, Croatian Radiotelevision, Sveriges Radio, Vermont Public, etc.

== Awards ==
List of the most important awards:

- 1998: DAAD – Berliner Künstlerprogramm Fellowship (Berlin, Germany)
- 2000: Schloss Wiepersdork Kultur Stiftung 2000 (Wiemersdorf, Germany)
- 2002: Karl Sczuka Preis (Donaueschingen, Germany) for composition Il tempo cambia.
- 2013: Grand Prix Nova – 3rd Prize (Bucharest, Romania) for the song Amore mio.
- 2022: UK International Radiodrama Festival – 2nd Prize (Canterbury, UK) for the radio-drama Mondi possibili.
- 2022: Grand Prix Nova for the Short Forms – 1st Prize (Bucharest, Romania) for the radio piece Animal song.
