= Friction idiophone =

Class of idiophones that produce sound through friction

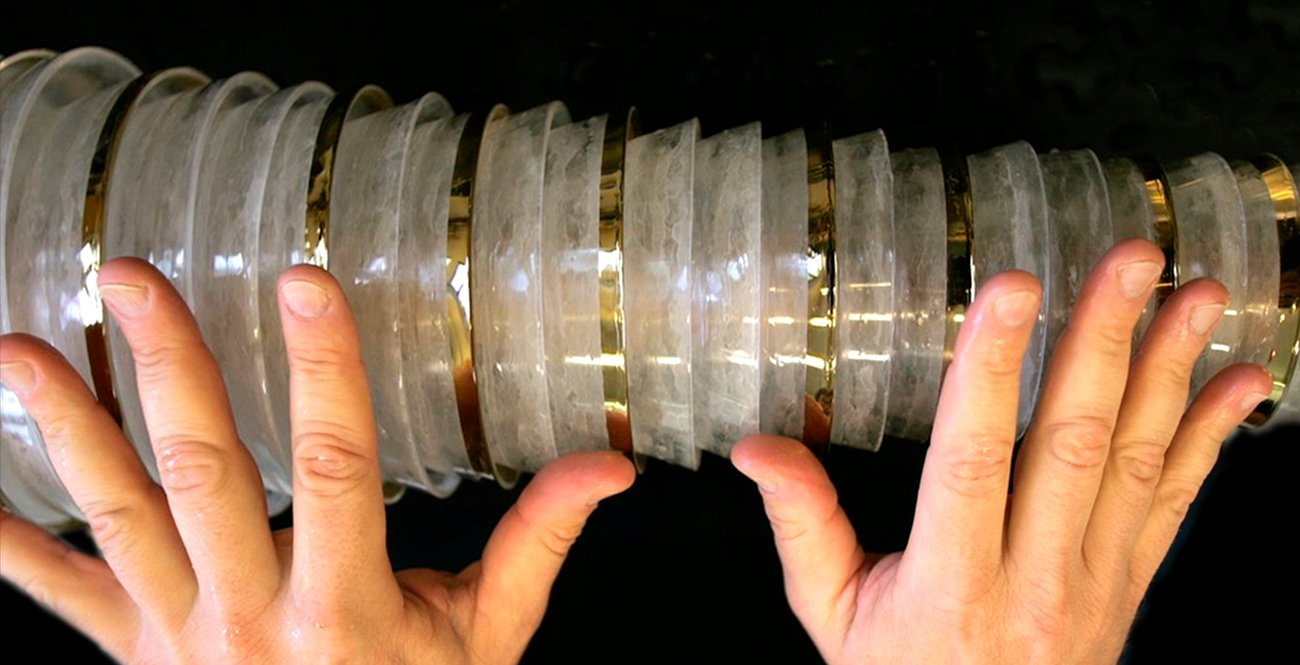
Glass harmonica; sound produced by friction of the fingers against the rotating glass

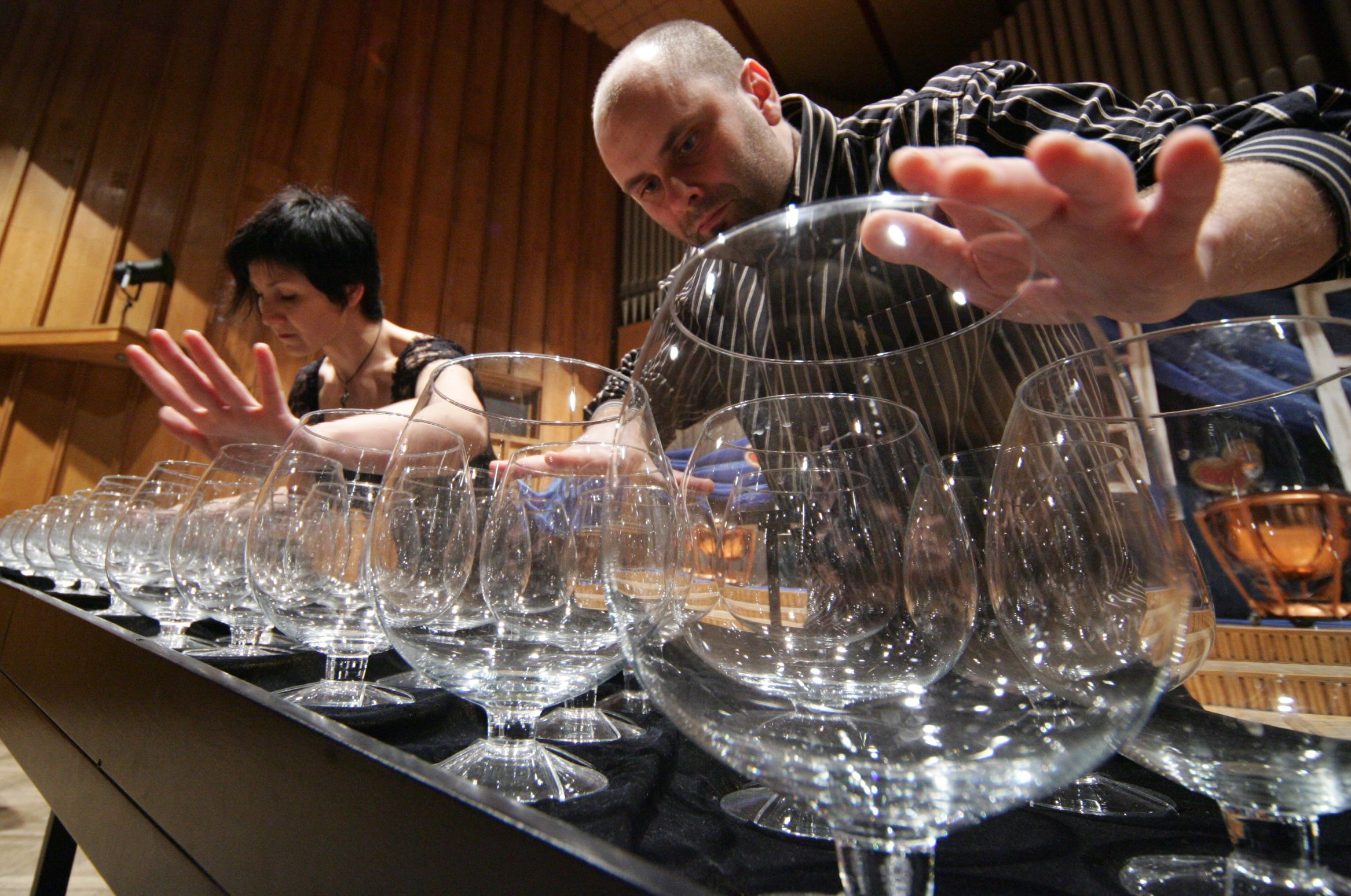
Glass harp; sound produced by friction of the fingers rotating against the wine glass rims

Terpodion; sound produced by friction of wood or metal arms against a rotating cylinder

Chladni plate example; sound produced by friction of the bow against a plate such as a metal rectangle

Friction idiophones is designation 13 in the Hornbostel-Sachs system of musical instrument classification. These idiophones produce sound by being rubbed either against each other or by means of a non-sounding object. Instruments of this type are not very common; possibly the best known examples are the musical saw and the nail violin.

According to musicologist Curt Sachs:

... It is essential to distinguish between rubbing and scraping. The latter results in a series of beats cause by passing a stick over a notched surface; [whereas] friction is based on adhesion....On a higher level we find...the glass harmonica.

== Friction sticks (131) ==
131.1 Individual friction sticks.

131.2 Sets of friction sticks.

- Nail violin
- Cristal baschet, preceded by the euphon

131.21 Without direct friction.

131.22 With direct friction.

== Friction plaques (132) ==
132.1 Individual friction plaques.

- Daxophone
- Musical saw
- Triolin
- Turntable

132.2 Sets of friction plaques.

- Clavicylinder

== Friction vessels (133) ==
133.1 Individual friction vessels.

- Rainstick
- Singing Bowl
- Ekola

133.2 Sets of friction vessels.

- Glass harmonica
- Glass harp
- Terpodion/melodion
- Verrophone

== See also ==
- Wind machine
