= Ekola =

Ovambo People musical instrument

The Ekola is a friction idiophone of the Ovambo people of Namibia. The instrument consists of two to four calabashes, sewn and plastered together in sequence from largest to smallest to form a linked series of resonating chambers. The largest calabash has a hole on its top. A notched palm rib extends over the length of the calabashes. Sound is produced by placing the Ekola on the ground so that the hole in the resonating chamber faces up, and alternately rubbing across the palm rib's notches with one short thick stick and a bundle of several long, thin sticks. In traditional Ovambo societies, only healers of the Third Gender ovashengi were allowed to play it.

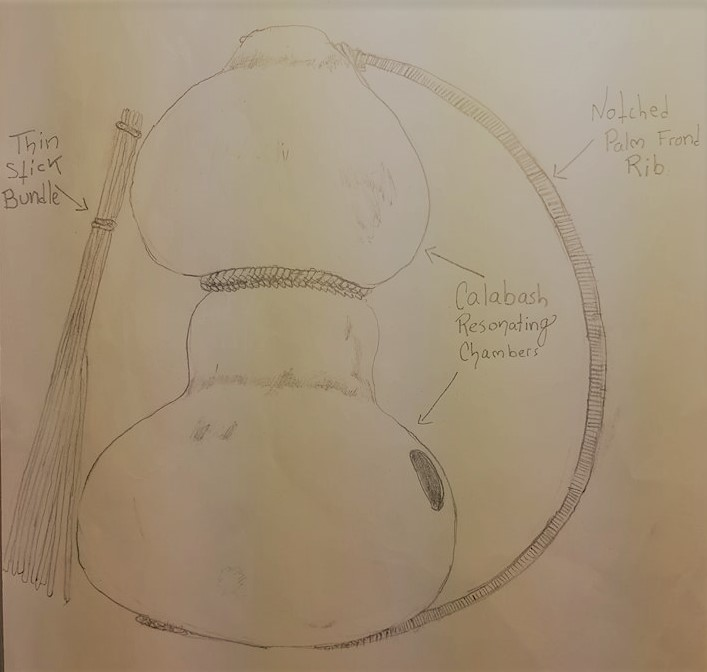
An Ekola, sketched from an instrument in the collection of the National Museum in Helsinki, Finland. This instrument is positioned sideways; it is played with the calabashes resting horizontal to each other under the palm rib bow .

== History ==
For most of its existence, the Ekola seems to have been limited in its use to particular rituals or private formal occasions, so that knowledge of its existence outside of Ovambo culture has been fleeting and intermittent. For example, after Italian missionary Giovanni Cavazzi published a drawing of the instrument in 1694, it was seemingly lost to outsiders until the 1930s when it was rediscovered by Scottish ethnomusicologist Percival Kirby. Having come across a strange instrument in an exhibition in Windhoek, Kirby brought it to his Ovambo associates, who after much persuasion reluctantly identified the instrument and told him its context.

== Cultural context ==
The Ekola was traditionally played in ceremonies, outside of earshot of women, by ovashengi, an Ovambo term for a gender caste of male homosexuals. Among its ritual uses was to accompany a song initiating men into ovashengi status, calling them away from their masculine gender role and into a lifelong feminine one.

According to University of Namibia historian Wolfram Hartmann, "the ovashengi of the Unkwambi, a subgroup of the Ovambo, are respected as healers, or onganga. Among another Ovambo subgroup, the Oukwanyama, the ovashengi are not treated as well; however, they are the only Oukwanyama members entitled to play the ekola, a special music[al] instrument".

While close familiarity with the Ekola was thus always limited, its status as 'a secret instrument' seems to have been a product of the homophobia that European colonialism enforced upon the Ovambo and other African people. Since the instrument was central in rituals centered around forms of sexual and gender expression forbidden by colonial regimes, even acknowledging recognition of it could risk attracting the attention of colonial religious and judicial authorities.
