= Glass flute =

Glass instrument

Excerpt from Bach's Partita in A minor for solo flute performed on a glass flute made by Claude Laurent c. 1825

A glass flute or crystal flute is a glass instrument briefly popular in the early 19th century. They are an unusual variety of the Western concert flute designed to preserve pitch and tone during temperature change better than the wood and ivory flutes available at the time of their manufacture. Most were made by Claude Laurent, a French craftsman and clockmaker who patented the leaded crystal glass flute in 1806. They became obsolete after metal flutes were produced. Other than sounding more consistent at differing temperatures, glass flutes are similar in tone to contemporary wooden and ivory flutes.

Laurent's glass flutes were manufactured in Paris in the early 19th century. About 185 of Laurent's instruments are known to have survived, with the United States Library of Congress holding 17 of these. Two are kept at Museu de la música in Spain.

== Construction ==
Some of the flutes built by Laurent are lead crystal and some are potash glass. To reduce weight and provide ornamentation, crystal flutes are cut with facets or fluting on the outside. The interior surface is precision ground and polished. Joints between the glass sections are silver. Some crystal flutes used natural quartz crystal end-caps. Laurent introduced the system of mounting flute keys on pillars, an innovation which became a standard that has outlived the popularity of the glass flute.

== James Madison's crystal flute ==
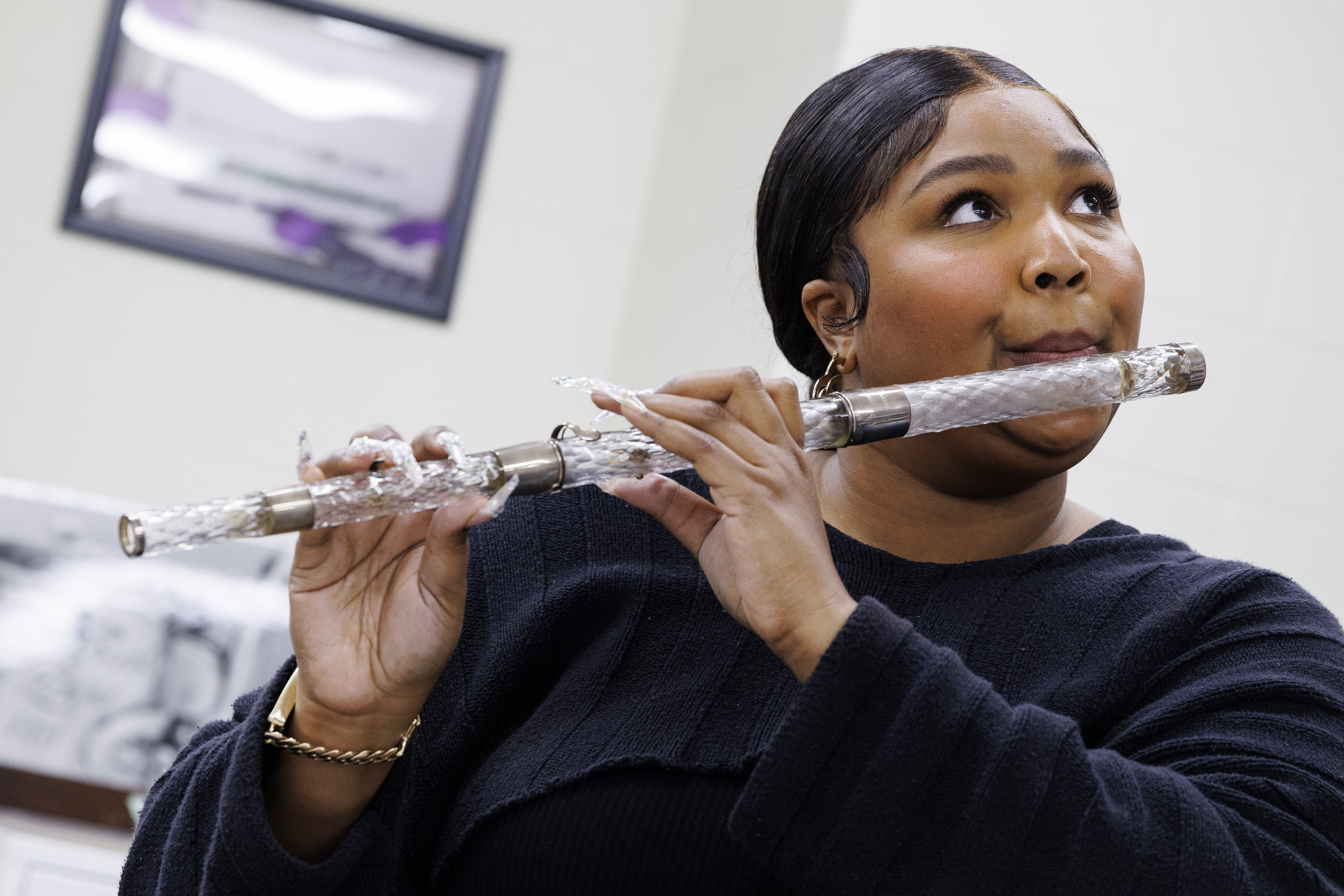
Artist Lizzo playing a crystal flute once owned by James Madison

Claude Laurent sent a crystal flute to James Madison to commemorate Madison's second inauguration as U.S. President in 1813. The flute was then rescued from the White House in April 1814 by the White House servants under the direction of First Lady Dolley Madison as the British entered Washington, D.C. during the War of 1812. Today the flute is held by the Library of Congress, which is believed to have the largest flute collection in the world.

In 2022, musical artist and classically trained flautist Lizzo was invited by Librarian of Congress Carla Hayden to view the Library's flute collection. While at the Library of Congress, Lizzo requested to play the Madison flute in concert. She then played it onstage at Capital One Arena, briefly twerking during the performance. After playing, she stated to the audience, "I just twerked and played James Madison's crystal flute from the 1800s. We just made history tonight."
