= Bruno Hoffmann =

German musician (1913–1991)

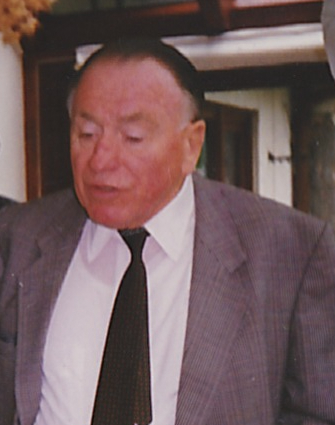
Bruno Hoffmann (1988)

Bruno Hoffmann (15 September 1913 – 11 April 1991) was a German glass harpist. Hoffmann is widely acknowledged as the virtuoso who reanimated contemporary interest in the glass harp and glass harmonica.

Bruno Hoffmann was born in Stuttgart, Germany, the son of a church music director. He was trained in piano and organ playing, but on encountering the "musical glasses" at age 16, his lifelong devotion to resurrecting this unearthly beauty was begun. He discovered and mastered the old repertoire for glass harp by Wolfgang Amadeus Mozart, Johann Friedrich Reichardt, Karl Leopold Röllig, Johann Abraham Peter Schulz, Johann Gottlieb Naumann and others, and also inspired several modern composers to write new works for him.

He was the author of the Glasharmonika article in the German music encyclopedia Musik in Geschichte und Gegenwart. He designed and built his own instrument beginning in 1929 (aged 16), consisting of a set of wine glasses mounted in a wooden box, whose rims were rubbed to produce the tone. He appeared all over Germany and the British Isles, performing solo and with various chamber and orchestral ensembles, and during his lifetime was featured on innumerable radio and television broadcasts and several recordings (including Federico Fellini's Casanova).

Hoffmann also appeared in several films, including a Benjamin Franklin documentary. He is also featured in the original score by Jack Nitzsche on the soundtrack of The Razor's Edge. He died in Stuttgart in 1991, aged 77.

== See also ==
- Glass harmonica
