= Glasschord =

French crystallophone instrument

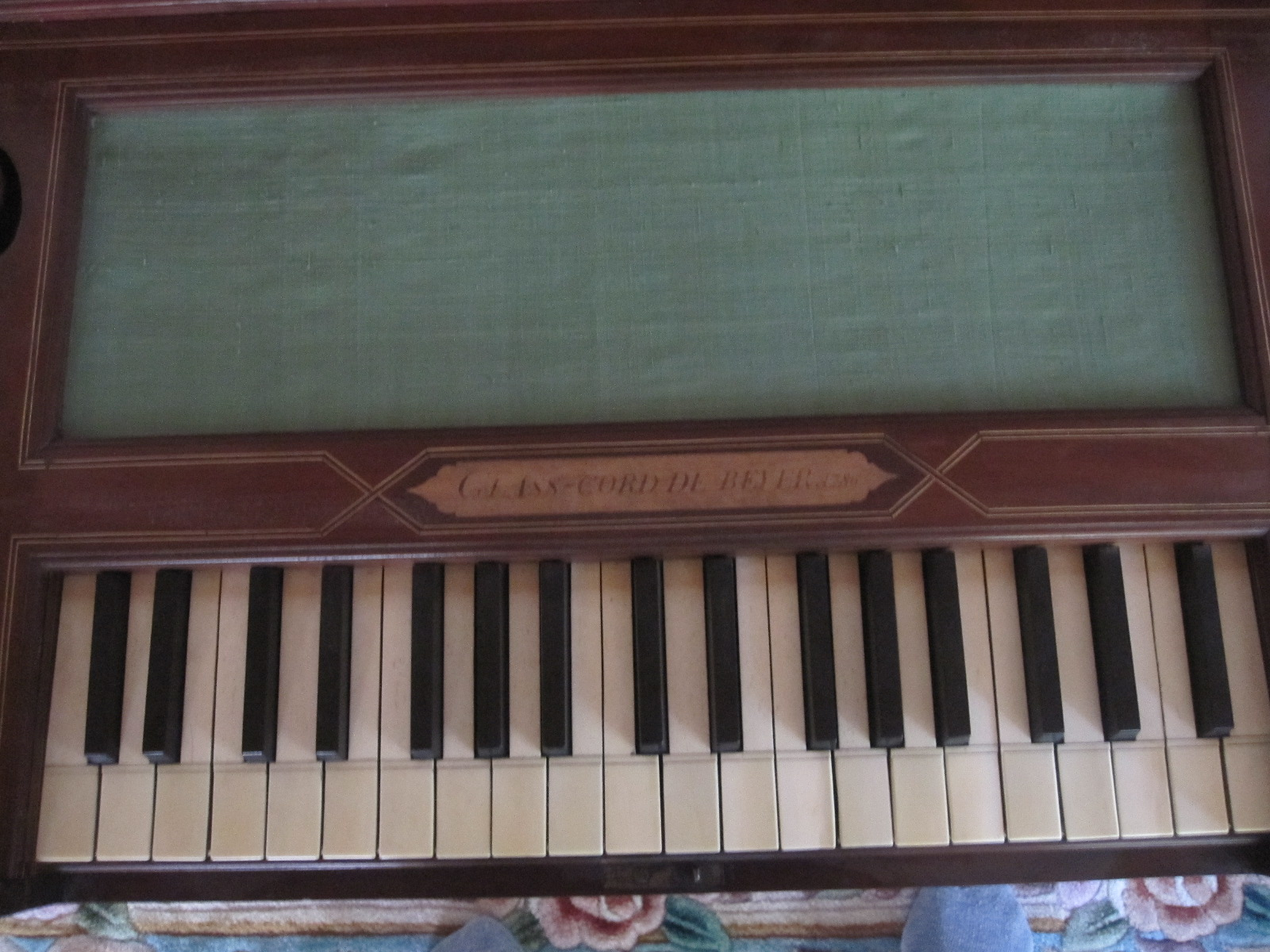
- 1786 Glasschord from the Hans Adler Collection
- Other names: Glasscord; glassichord; Glace-chord; keyboard harmonica; piano harmonica
- Classification: Idiophone
- Inventor: M. Beyer
- Developed: 1785

Related instruments
- Glass harmonica

Builders
- Chappell & Co.

The glasschord (French: fortepiano à cordes de verre) (also known historically as a keyboard harmonica) is a struck crystallophone resembling the celesta.

== History ==
The glasschord was invented circa 1785 by physicist M. Beyer of Paris. It creates sound by using cloth covered wooden hammers to strike glass tubes laid on a cloth strip, with no dampeners. The instrument has a range of three octaves, in various models from c' to c'', f' to f'', and g' to g''. The instrument was largely inspired by the glass harmonica created by Benjamin Franklin, and was given the name glasschord by him. On 6 July 1785, Thomas Jefferson that Franklin carried a version of the instrument with him, describing it as a sticcado.

Beyer originally presented the instrument on 19 January 1785, in a presentation at the French Academy of Sciences, while the instrument still was nameless, with the instrument being publicised in the Journal de Paris multiple times through the same year.

Many glasschords were built by Chappell & Co., until around 1815.

The instrument was used in some scores, most notable by Hector Berlioz, who wrote the first version of La Tempête, and Camille Saint-Saëns who used the instrument in L'aquarium.
