= Thomas Newburgh =

Thomas Newburgh (c. 1695–1779) was an Irish poet.

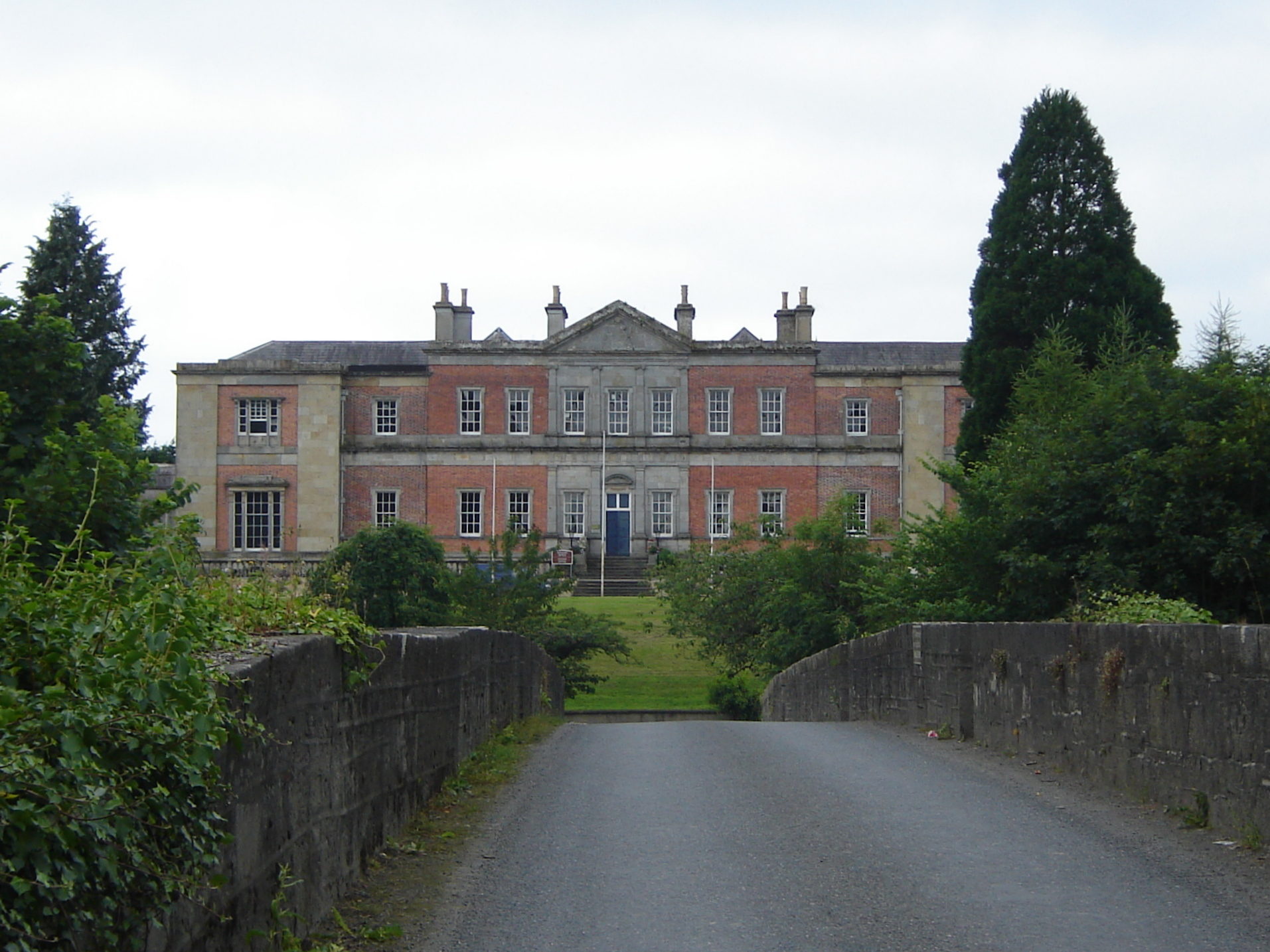
Ballyhaise House, County Cavan

He was the eldest son of Brockhill Newburgh, chairman of the board of linen manufacturers, who owned estates and property at Ballyhaise, County Cavan. Amongst his works was a miscellaneous collection, Essays, Poetical, Moral, &c., 1769, sometimes appearing in bibliographic records as the work of his father. Newburgh attended Oxford University, but returned to Ireland when he inherited the family estate. Newburgh's poetry included descriptions of buildings and monuments, unusual for the period, such as the lines on a walk at St Stephen's Green.
