= Marianne Davies =

English singer who also played flute and harpsichord

Marianne Davies (1743 or 1744 – c. 1818) was an English classical musician, daughter of the composer and flautist Richard Davies and the sister of the soprano Cecilia Davies. She was a singer who also played flute and harpsichord. She was hailed as a child prodigy of the flute, and on April 7, 1751 at Hickford's Long Room, at the age of seven, played not only a concerto of her own composition on the flute, but also a harpsichord concerto by Handel. She was prevented from pursuing the flute by prevailing gendered stereotypes, as the flute was almost exclusively played by men. Performing in public on male-coded instruments, as Davies did on the flute at this time, was a highly radical act, so she switched to the glass harmonica.

Marianne initially was a vocal teacher to her sister Cecilia. Marianne began to tour at a young age and performed in benefit concerts that were held for her. In 1753, she played another benefit concert for herself in Soho where she played a Handel concerto on harpsichord as well. In a benefit concert in 1757 she played German flute with her father.

In 1762 she became the first person to publicly perform on the glass harmonica (also known as the armonica), an instrument consisting of variously sized and tuned glass bowls that rotate on a common shaft, played by touching the spinning glass with wet fingers. It is believed that the first performance was on February 18, 1762 in Spring Gardens. She held these performances from March 27 to April 16. Davies also taught the armonic to the daughters of empress Maria Theresa. These daughters would later become queens; Marie Antoinette of France and Maria Carolina of Naples.

She toured in concerts with her sister and father, performing in Dublin (1763), London, and on the Continent where the two girls became acquainted with the Mozart family. Beethoven also composed music for the instrument.

She corresponded regularly with Benjamin Franklin, who invented the instrument. Various correspondence in the historical archives outlines her failing health, and her desire to have the opportunity to play the instrument again before her death.
