= Brockhill Taylor =

Brockhill Taylor (died 1636) was a member of Parliament for Cavan Borough from 1634 to 1635 in the Irish House of Commons.

In 1609 his father, John Taylor from Cambridge, had received the patentee of Ballyhaise, namely 1,500 acres (6.1 km^{2}) of arable land in Barony of Loughtee. The new landowners replaced the existing Irish cultivators with peasant farmers from England and Scotland. They were also barred from selling their lands to any Irishman.

He was grandfather of Richard Pockrich (MP for County Monaghan) (1713–14)

He was grandfather of Colonel Brockhill Newburgh (MP for County Cavan 1715–27).
