= Crystallophone =

Glass instrument

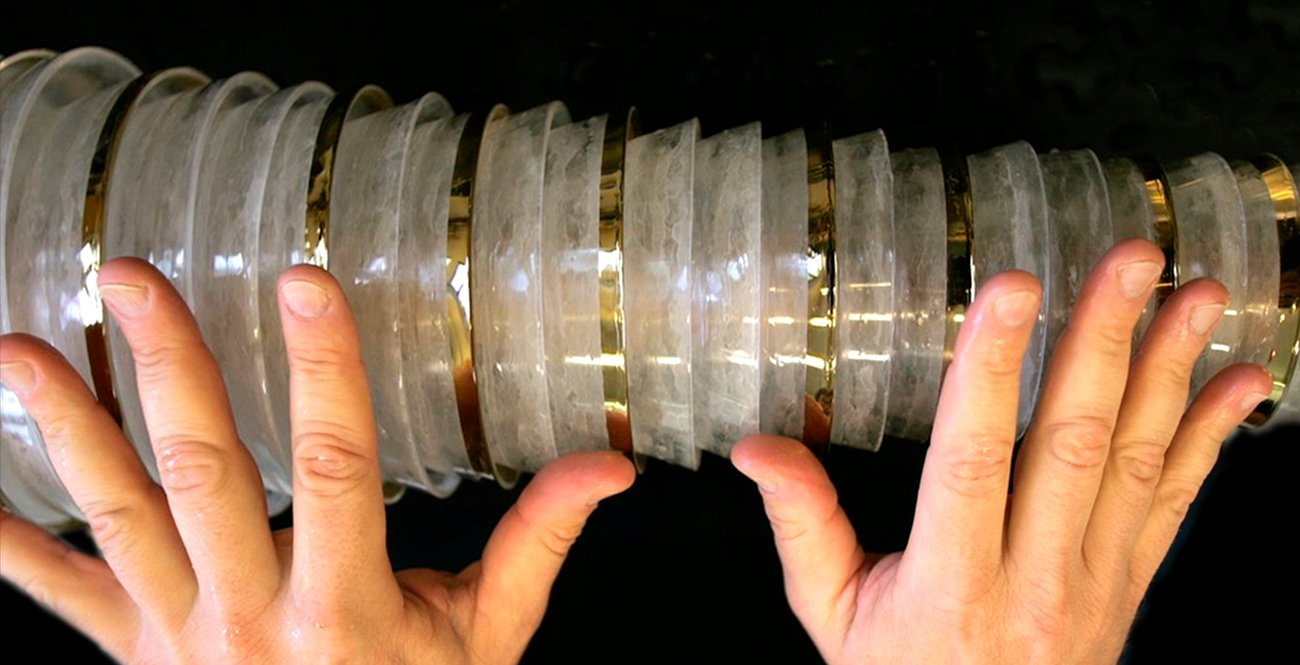
Glass harmonica: spinning glass disks (bowls) on a common shaft are arranged with the lower notes (larger disks) to the left and higher notes (smaller disks) to the right.

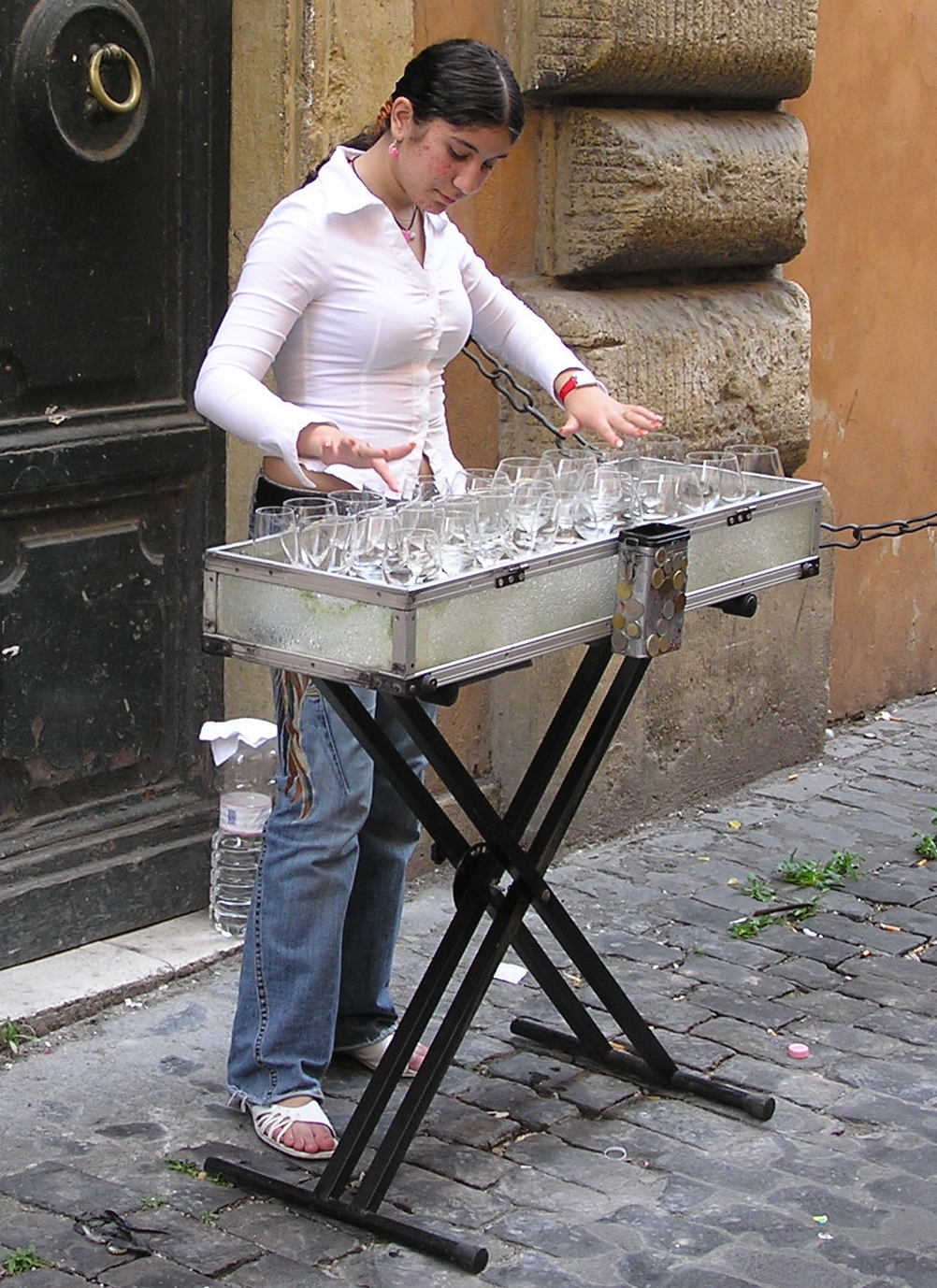
A glass harp being played in Rome, Italy. The rims of wine glasses filled with water are rubbed by the player's fingers to create the notes.

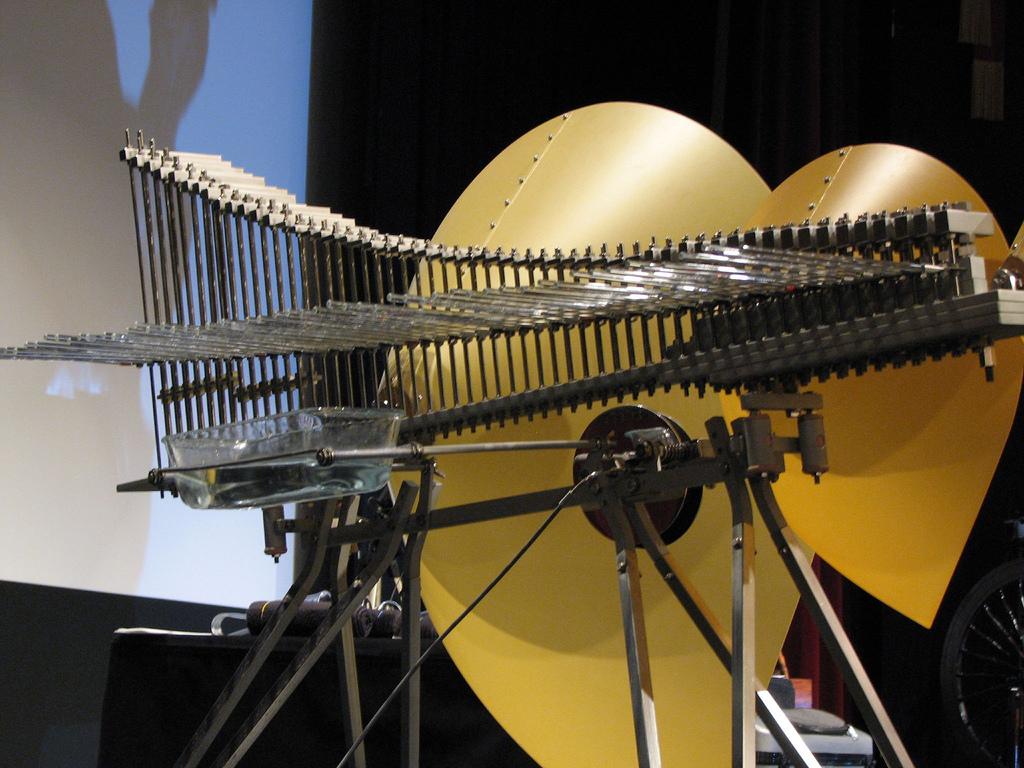
The Cristal Baschet

A crystallophone is a musical instrument that produces sound from glass.

One of the best known crystallophones is the glass harmonica, a set of rotating glass bowls which produce eerie, clear tones when rubbed with a wet finger. Musical glasses, the glass harp, were documented in Persia in the 14th century. The "ethereal" quality of instruments such as the glass harmonica exemplified the Empfindsamkeit and for a while, "the instrument was extraordinarily popular...[but] About 1830 the instrument fell into oblivion."

The glasschord (or glasscord) resembles the celesta (a struck plaque idiophone operated by a keyboard) but uses keyboard-driven hammers to strike glass bars instead of metal bars.

The glass marimba is similar to the marimba (a stick percussion instrument with a keyboard layout), but has bars of glass instead of wood. The bars, which the performer strikes with padded sticks, are perched on a glass box to provide the necessary resonance.

A rare Thai instrument called ranat kaeo (ระนาดแก้ว; literally "glass xylophone") has been used by the Thai music ensemble Fong Naam; it appears on their 1992 CD The Sleeping Angel: Thai Classical Music.

== In popular culture ==
In Lydia Syson's biography, Doctor of Love: James Graham and his Celestial Bed, sexologist James Graham uses the glass harmonica for musical therapy purposes.

Benjamin Franklin was inspired to create his glass harmonica in 1763 after attending a recital performed on musical glasses in London in 1761.

== See also ==
- Lithophone
- Verrophone
