= Richard Pockrich (inventor) =

Irish musician and inventor

Richard Pockrich, Poekrich (c.1696/7 – 1759), or Puckeridge, was an Irish musician, and was the inventor of the glass harp (also known as the "Angelic organ") around 1741.

== Life ==
He was born at his family's estate Derrylusk at Aghnamallagh, County Monaghan, Ireland. His father, also named Richard (c.1666–1719), was the Member of Parliament (MP) for Monaghan and had commanded troops in the Williamite battles. The paternal descent was of an English family from Surrey. Some notices indicate that Poekrich was the name of the family, and this was the spelling he gave on his works. He is reported to have been aged 25 when his father died (1720?), so a probable year of birth has been fixed to 1695. Poekrich received a substantial inheritance, valued at a figure between £1,000 (Newburgh) and £4,000 (Pilkington).

Variations of his name include Puckeridge or Pokeridge, or styled as 'Captain Poekrich' in contemporary notices. His unsuccessful ventures included a brewery in Dublin, near Islandbridge, the tale of its decline is intertwined with that of his greatest success, his musical glasses. When bailiffs came to arrest Poekrich for his debts, he entranced them with an impromptu performance on his "Angelic organ'; his subsequent pardon is given as the earliest example of a belief in the psychological effect of the instrument, later adopted by Mesmer.

Another proposal was raising geese on the barren terrain of his purchases in County Wicklow. Other schemes included an observatory to pursue his interest in astrology. His imagination extended to an orchestra of various sized drums, arranged to be played by one person.

His political involvement included lobbying the Parliament of Ireland for planting vineyards by draining the Irish bogs. He also proposed the development of metal-hulled ships, some 100 years before their eventual introduction, carrying lifeboats made of tin. Despite his grand platform for election, he failed to win when he ran for Parliament (twice, 1745 Monaghan and 1749 Dublin).

An enthusiast of blood transfusion, he believed that disease could be cured and life extended by the use of healthy donors. A description of the procedure proposes the use of servants or other physically active specimens. Anticipating the problems of immortality that might result, Pockrich proposed an act decreeing that "anyone attaining the age of 999 years shall be deemed ... dead in law".

He made numerous other proposals, including a plan to link the River Liffey and River Shannon by a series of canals. Descriptions of his schemes might be seen as exaggeration or distortion by their dubious authorities, but records of advertisements placed by Poekrich support the number of unrealised proposals.

He also failed in his application to become Master of the Choristers of Armagh Cathedral.

Pockrich was unmarried until he was 50; Margaret White became his wife in 1745. She sailed from England with the actor Theophilus Cibber, apparently eloping and fleeing debt, and died in a shipwreck on the Scottish coast in 1758.

He toured England with his musical glasses since about 1756; while staying in London in 1759, he died in a fire.

== Works ==
Pockrich eventually found success with his performances of his musical glasses and is credited with their invention around 1741; he first appeared with it in public at the Smock Alley Theatre, Dublin, 3 May 1743. He named the instrument an "angelic organ". His decrepit rooms were given over to development of his design and performance of it. His early method of playing, using wooden sticks, is comparable to a similar instrument, the "glassspiel" or "verrillon", designed a few years earlier on known principles.

His "virtuoso" performances, accompanied by a singer, received good notices, and reported to have been a popular act. He toured around England and Ireland. His repertoire included works by Handel. The technique he used involved stroking the glass with sticks, but Franklin said he later switched to the "wet-finger-around-the-wine-glass" method.

One popular performance was "Tell me, lovely Shepherd", sung by a Miss Young. He published a collection of poetry, his Miscellaneous Works appearing in 1750.

The instrument was adopted by Gluck, who presented it on 23 April 1746 as "a concerto on 26 drinking-glasses tuned with spring water", and performances were popular for half a century. His pupils continued after the death of the originator, a performance in 1760 by one Anne Ford is mentioned in a short notice by Flood. Forde wrote an instruction manual and toured Europe and England.

Pilkington gave a description of Pockrich constructing an instrument, simulating a dulcimer, during a meeting at his home; by hammering pins and wire on the table, the visitor laid his head to hear his request for Black Joke.

== Legacy ==
Poekrich is best remembered for the popularisation of musical glasses, via his promotion and influence, that he discovered in the later years of his life. Descriptions of his character — as a proposer of "wild" schemes — range from sympathetic views as "quixotic" to those of an "enterprising scoundrel".

The earliest biographical notices began with David O'Donoghue, a brief notice in his dictionary Poets of Ireland (1891–93), and the same author's longer notice was in the Dictionary of National Biography, 1900, these being the first two references on the inventor and his works.

O'Donoghue notes the autobiographical Memoirs of John Carteret Pilkington and also draws on the miscellaneous collection Essays, Poetical, Moral, &c. (1769) by Thomas Newburgh (c.1695–1779), attributing the relevant material to his father Brockhill Newburgh writing in 1743, and the early or contemporary sources in Thomas Campbell's Philosophical Survey; Conran's National Music of Ireland; the Gentleman's Magazine, 1759; and his own reference work, Poets of Ireland. Campbell in a notice in A Philosophical Survey of the South of Ireland (1776), in asserting Poekrich's eminence in music, stated that performances of his instrument, while lacking great force, produced the sweetest of tones.

The article appeared as the last in volume 15 of the DNB, a bibliographic quibble notes that "Poekrich" is the correct spelling and it should have been included in the next volume. The brief notice given there suggests a detail on his death.

"in 1759 in a fire which broke out in his room at Hamlin's Coffee-house, Sweeting's Alley, near the Royal Exchange, London." [emph. added]

O'Donoghue expanded his work to a longer article, published as "An Irish Musical Genius". Like other early biographers, who repeated references in the few contemporary source, the publications of their subject were largely ignored and depended on questionable views.

Pilkington, the son of Laetitia Pilkington, sang during Pockrich's show and was apparently intimate during his youth, but gives no later information of him. Pilkington gives does give a later mention to "Captain Poekrich, the glass projector" in his memoirs, grudgingly admitting to his value as a performer when his listener recognised him and agreed to request a concert. No reply was received, as he died around that time.

Brockhill Newburgh of County Cavan was related to Pockrich, apparently making him the subject of a mocking poem, "The Projector", a first attempt at what would have been a 24 volume work entitled "The Pockreiad". The notes to this unfinished work detail the author's ridicule of his subject's notions, though he gives exception to his highly regarded musical glasses; this became a key source of information on the life of Richard Pockrich.

The elegiac text of Newburgh:

Mourn him, ye bogs, in tears discharge your tides,

No more shall Pockrich tap your spongy hides;
Ye geese, ye ganders, cackle doleful lays,
No more his mountain tops your flocks shall graze;
Be silent, dumb, ye late harmonious glasses—
Free from surprise, serenely sleep, ye lasses.
Let drums, unbraced, in hollow murmurs tell
How he that waked their thunders silent fell.
Let tempests swell the surge, no more his boat,
Secure from wreck, shall on the billows float;
No more, ye sons of Nappy, shall his beer
Or nut-brown ale your dropping spirits cheer,
To his own castles, built sublime in air,
Quitting his geese and bogs and glassy care,
With blood infused, and, like a meteor bright,

On his own pinions, Pock has winged his flight.

W. H. Grattan Flood asserted Richard Pockrich's importance and influence in his A History of Irish Music, crediting him as the inventor in 1741, and summarising his legacy with a quote from the Vicar of Wakefield (1761),

"... the ladies from London could talk of nothing but 'pictures, taste, Shakespeare, and the musical glasses.'" [and] "Benjamin Franklin improved the instrument, and called it the "Armonica"; and for it Mozart, Hasse, Beethoven, Naumann, and other masters wrote."

A catalogue of the British Museum notes volume 1 of a title, Miscellaneous works, 1755 at Dublin, attributed to "Poekrich (Richard) esqr."
