= Videomaker =

- Editor: Matthew York
- Categories: Trade journal
- Frequency: Monthly
- Publisher: York Publishing
- Founded: 1986
- Company: Videomaker, Inc.
- Country: United States
- Language: English
- Website: Videomaker
- ISSN: 0889-4973

Videomaker is a magazine publication dedicated to video production. The magazine's publisher and editor, Matthew York, founded the publication with his wife Patrice York, Associate Publisher, to "empower people to make video and to democratize and enrich television."

== Overview ==
Videomaker Magazine provides reviews and previews of the latest hardware and software for the video hobbyist and professional. Articles cover the use of camcorders, video production, digital video editing, audio production, DVD authoring, lighting, distribution and other items of interest to the video enthusiast. Issues cover industry news, buyer's guides, product reviews, step-by-step instructions and feedback from readers. Its articles rate and review the latest equipment, teach production techniques, and explain new technological advances.

== Publications ==
- The Videomaker Guide to Video Production. Focal Press. 2007. ISBN 978-0-240-80968-7.
