= Brockhill Newburgh =

Colonel Brockhill Newburgh (c. 1659 – 11 January 1741) was an Irish politician.

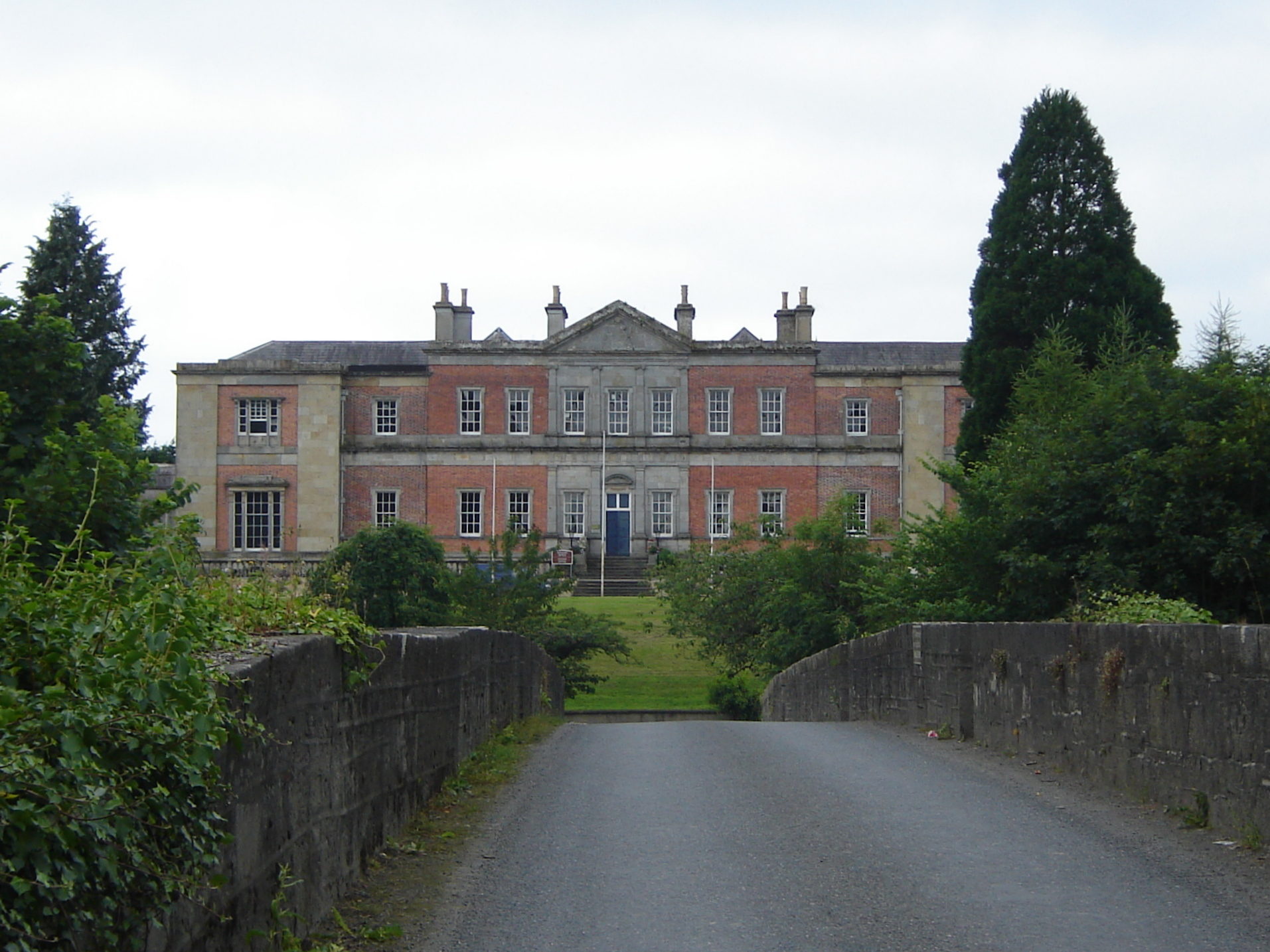
Ballyhaise House, Co. Cavan

He was the second son of Thomas Newburgh and his wife Mary, the daughter of Brockhill Taylor, M.P, of Ballyhaise, who had represented Cavan Borough in the Irish House of Commons. He inherited the estate of Ballyhaise in 1697 on the death of his elder brother. He was appointed High Sheriff of Cavan for 1704.

From 1715 until 1727, Newburgh sat as Member of Parliament (MP) for County Cavan. He was chairman of the Linen Board. He built Ballyhaise House, and did much to improve the village of Ballyhaise, erecting the first stone bridge there.

He married Maria, the daughter of Oliver More of Salestown, Co. Kildare, and died on 11 January 1741/2, leaving four sons and two daughters. His eldest son and heir was the poet Thomas Newburgh, publisher of Essays, Poetical, Moral, &c., 1769, a work that perhaps contains notes from, and is sometimes attributed to, Brockhill Newburgh.

Parliament of Ireland
Preceded by Sir Francis Hamilton, 3rd Bt; Robert Saunderson	Member of Parliament for County Cavan; 1715–1727; With: Mervyn Pratt	Succeeded by Charles Coote; John Maxwell
