= Glass harmonica =

Type of musical instrument

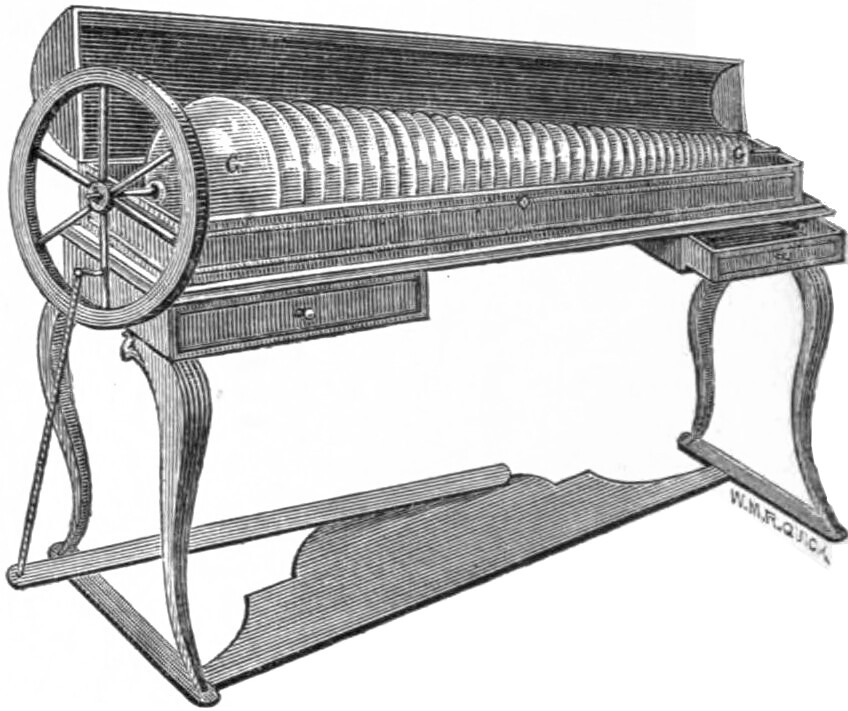
- 1900 illustration of a glass harmonica
- Other names: Glass armonica, Glass harmonium, Bowl organ, Hydrocrystalophone, Armonica, Harmonica
- Classification: Idiophone
- Inventor: Benjamin Franklin
- Developed: 1761

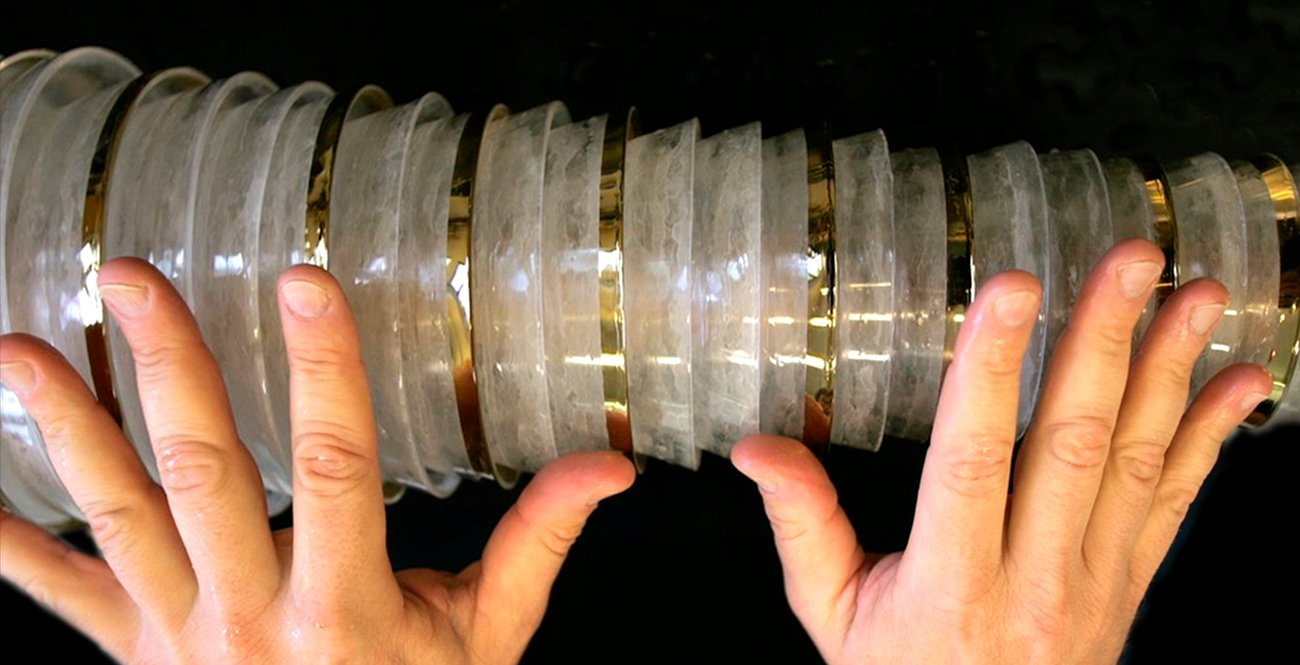
Spinning glass disks (bowls) on a common shaft are arranged with the lower notes (larger disks) to the left and higher notes (smaller disks) to the right.

The glass harmonica, also known as the glass armonica, glass harmonium, bowl organ, hydrocrystalophone, or simply the armonica or harmonica is a type of musical instrument that uses a series of glass bowls or goblets graduated in size to produce musical tones by means of friction (instruments of this type are known as friction idiophones). It was invented in 1761 by Benjamin Franklin and produces sound that is ethereal and haunting, with a flute-like tone that can hold long notes.

== Nomenclature ==
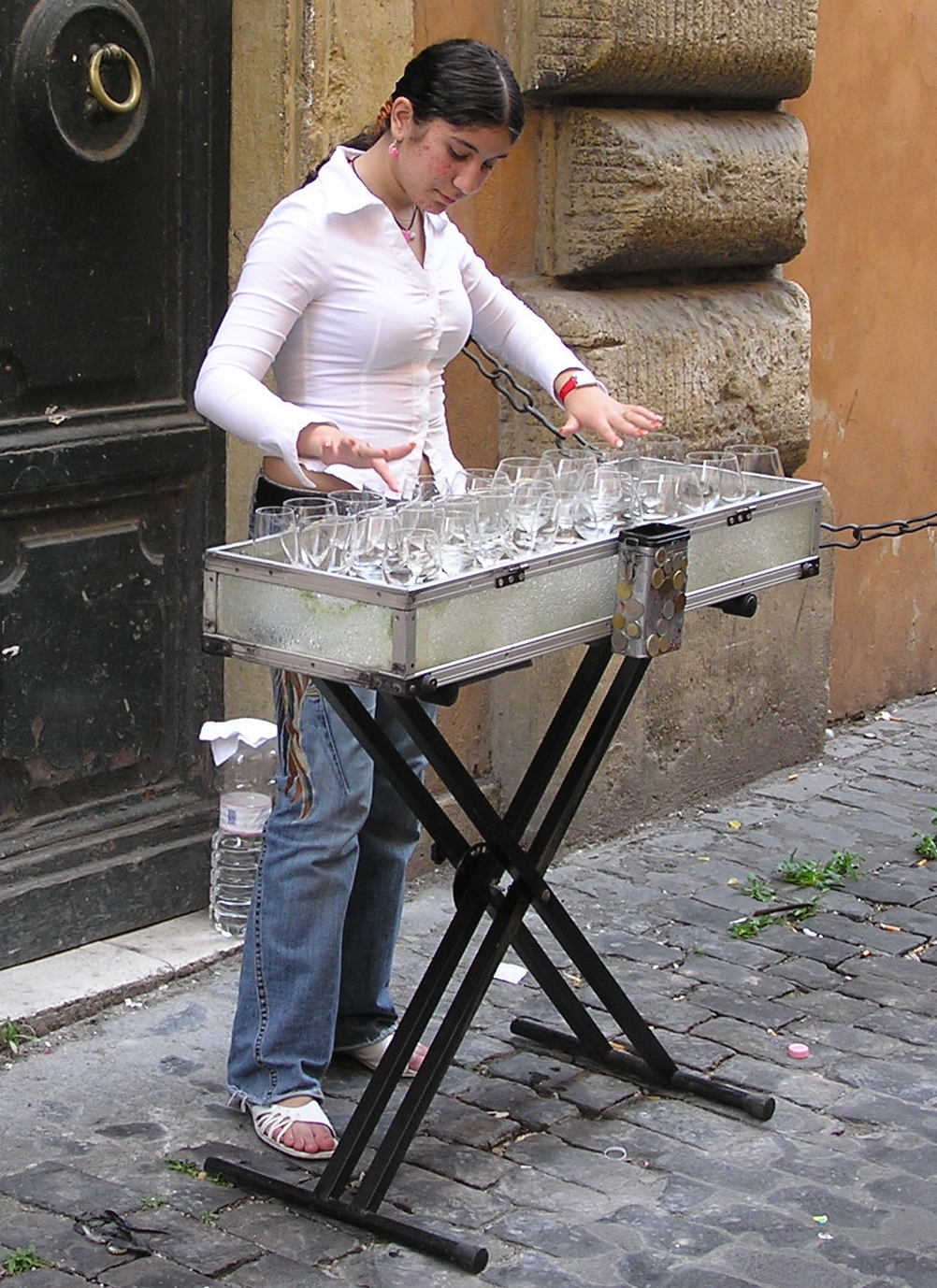
A glass harp, an ancestor of the glass armonica, being played in Rome. The rims of wine glasses filled with water are rubbed by the player's fingers to create the notes.

The name "glass harmonica" (also "glass armonica", "glassharmonica"; harmonica de verre, harmonica de Franklin, armonica de verre, or just harmonica in French; Glasharmonika in German; harmonica in Dutch) refers today to any instrument played by rubbing glass or crystal goblets or bowls. "Harmonica" is derived from ἁρμονία, harmonia, the Greek word for harmony. The alternative instrument consisting of a set of wine glasses (usually tuned with water) is generally known in English as "musical glasses" or the "glass harp".

When Benjamin Franklin invented his mechanical version of the instrument in 1761, he called it the armonica, based on the Italian word armonia, which means "harmony". The unrelated free-reed wind instrument aeolina, today called the "harmonica", was not invented until 1821, sixty years later.

The word "hydrodaktulopsychicharmonica" is also recorded, composed of Greek roots to mean something like "harmonica to produce music for the soul by fingers dipped in water" (hydro- for "water", daktul- for "finger", psych- for "soul"). The Oxford Companion to Music mentions that this word is "the longest section of the Greek language ever attached to any musical instrument, for a reader of The Times wrote to that paper in 1932 to say that in his youth he heard a performance of the instrument where it was called a hydrodaktulopsychicharmonica." The Museum of Music in Paris displays a hydrodaktulopsychicharmonica.

== Forerunners ==
Because its sounding portion is made of glass, the glass harmonica is a type of crystallophone. The phenomenon of rubbing a wet finger around the rim of a wine goblet to produce tones is documented back to Renaissance times; Galileo considered the phenomenon (in his Two New Sciences), as did Athanasius Kircher.

The Irish musician Richard Pockrich is typically credited as the first to play an instrument composed of glass vessels (glass harp) by rubbing his fingers around the rims. Beginning in the 1740s, he performed in London on a set of upright goblets filled with varying amounts of water. His career was cut short by a fire in his room, which killed him and destroyed his apparatus.

Edward Delaval, a friend of Benjamin Franklin and a fellow of the Royal Society, extended the experiments of Pockrich, contriving a set of glasses better tuned and easier to play. During the same decade, Christoph Willibald Gluck also attracted attention playing a similar instrument in England. In April 1760, the poet Thomas Gray wrote to James Brown, Master of Pembroke College, Cambridge, of a performance by Delaval that: "No instrument I know has so celestial a tone. It was like a cherubim in a box."

== Franklin's armonica ==
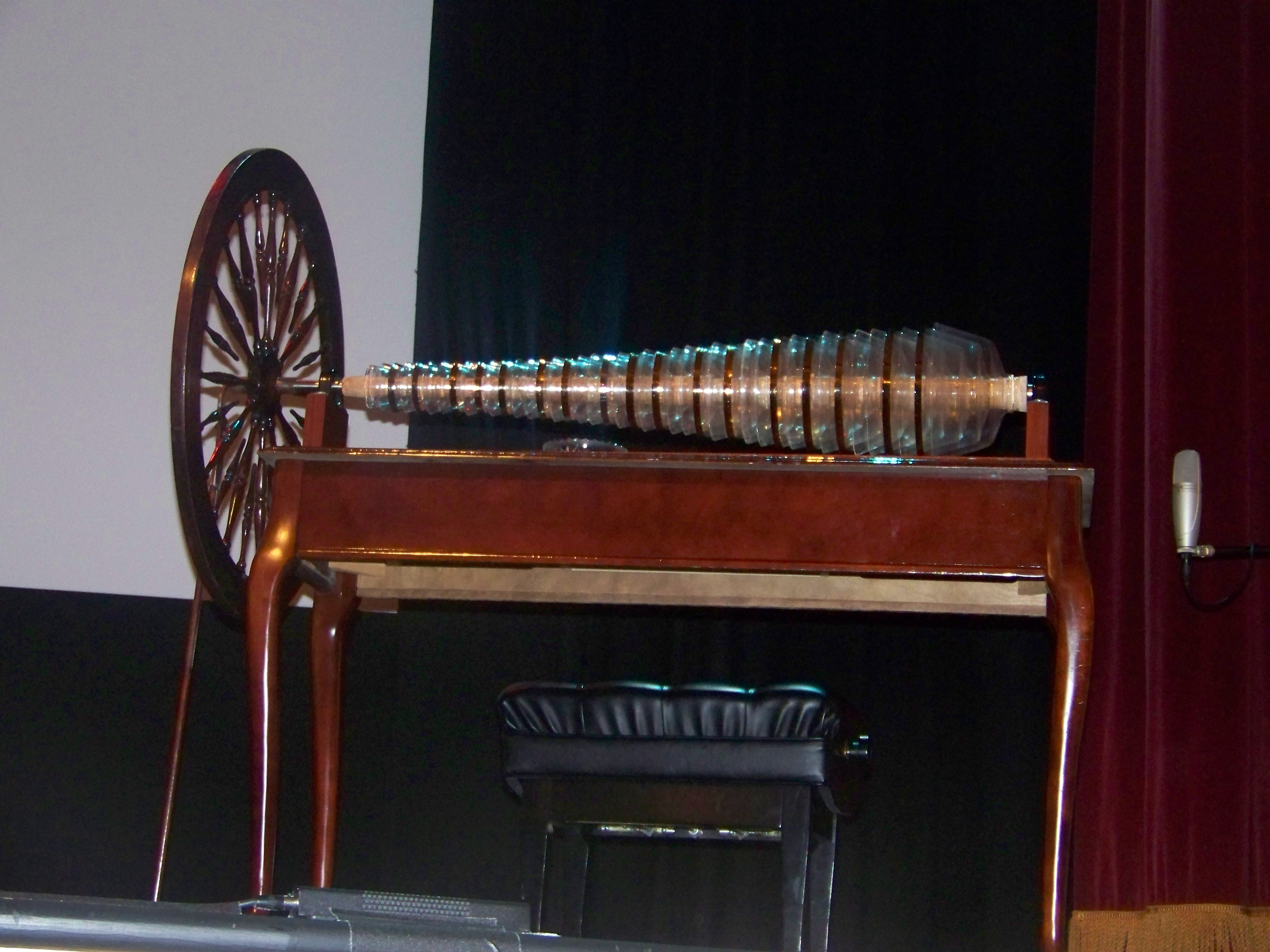
A modern glass armonica built using Benjamin Franklin's design

Benjamin Franklin invented a radically new arrangement of the glasses in 1761 after seeing water-filled wine glasses played by Edward Delaval at Cambridge in England in May 1761. Franklin worked with London glassblower Charles James to build one, and it had its world premiere in early 1762, played by Marianne Davies.

In a letter addressed to his friend Giambattista Beccaria, an Italian priest, physicist and mathematician in Turin, Franklin wrote from London in 1762 about his musical instrument: "The advantages of this instrument are, that its tones are incomparably sweet beyond those of any other; that they may be swelled and softened at pleasure by stronger or weaker pressures of the finger, and continued to any length; and that the instrument, being well tuned, never again wants tuning. In honour of your musical language, I have borrowed from it the name of this instrument, calling it the Armonica."

In Franklin's treadle-operated version, 37 bowls were mounted horizontally on an iron spindle. The whole spindle turned by means of a foot pedal. The sound was produced by touching the rims of the bowls with water-moistened fingers. Rims were painted different colors according to the pitch of the note: A (dark blue), B (purple), C (red), D (orange), E (yellow), F (green), G (blue), and accidentals were marked in white. With the Franklin design, it is possible to play ten glasses simultaneously if desired, a technique that is very difficult if not impossible to execute using upright goblets. Franklin also advocated the use of a small amount of powdered chalk on the fingers, which under some acidic water conditions helped produce a clear tone.

Some attempted improvements on the armonica included adding keyboards, placing pads between the bowls to reduce sympathetic vibrations, and using violin bows. Another supposed improvement, based upon later observations of non-playing instruments, was to have the glasses rotate into a trough of water. However, William Zeitler put this idea to the test by rotating an armonica cup into a basin of water; the water has the same effect as putting water in a wine glass – it changes the pitch. With several dozen glasses, each a different diameter and thus rotating with a different depth, the result would be musical cacophony. This modification also made it much harder to make the glass "speak", and muffled the sound.

In 1975, an original armonica was acquired by the Bakken Museum in Minneapolis and put on display, albeit without its original glass bowls (they were destroyed during shipment). It was purchased through a musical instrument dealer in France, from the descendants of Mme. Brillon de Jouy, a neighbor of Benjamin Franklin's from 1777 to 1785, when he lived in the Paris suburb of Passy. Some 18th- and 19th-century specimens of the armonica have survived into the 21st century. Franz Mesmer also played the armonica and used it as an integral part of his Mesmerism.

An original Franklin armonica is in the archives at the Franklin Institute in Philadelphia, having been donated in 1956 by Franklin's descendants after "the children took great delight in breaking the bowls with spoons" during family gatherings. It is only placed on display for special occasions, such as Franklin's birthday. The Franklin Institute is also the home of the Benjamin Franklin National Memorial.

A website has attempted to catalog publicly known Franklin-era glass armonicas. The Museum of Fine Arts, Boston has an early 19th-century instrument on display, which is occasionally used for public performances and recordings.

== Musical works ==
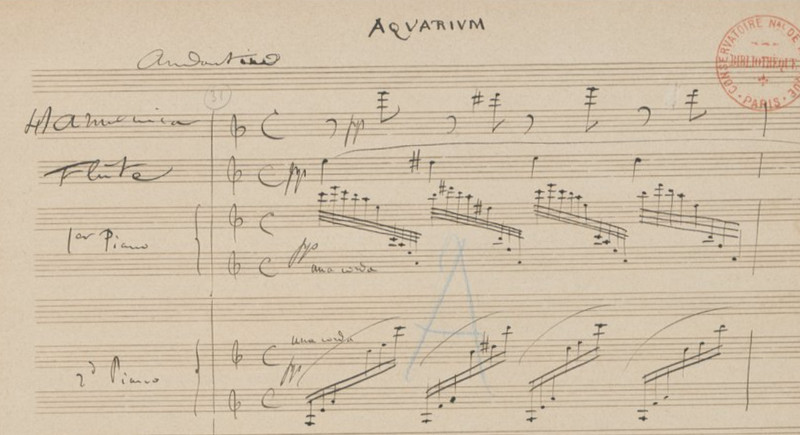
Part of the original manuscript score of "Aquarium" from The Carnival of the Animals by Camille Saint-Saëns. The top staff was written for the (glass) "Harmonica".

The Fixed Stars, the Frontier to the Beyond
A piece played almost entirely on a glass harmonica.

Composers including J. G. Naumann, Padre Martini, Johann Adolph Hasse, Baldassare Galuppi, and Niccolò Jommelli, and more than 100 others composed works for the glass harmonica; some pieces survive in the repertoire through transcriptions for more conventional instruments. European monarchs indulged in playing it, and even Marie Antoinette took lessons as a child from Franz Anton Mesmer.

Wolfgang Amadeus Mozart wrote his 1791 K. 617 and K.356 (K.617a) for the glass harmonica. Ludwig van Beethoven used the instrument in his 1814 melodrama Leonore Prohaska. Gaetano Donizetti used the instrument in the accompaniment to Amelia's aria "Par che mi dica ancora" in Il castello di Kenilworth, premiered in 1829. He also originally specified the instrument in Lucia di Lammermoor (1835) as a haunting accompaniment to the heroine's "mad scene", though before the premiere he was required by the producers to rewrite the part for two flutes. Camille Saint-Saëns used this instrument in his 1886 The Carnival of the Animals (in movements 7 and 14). Richard Strauss used the instrument in his 1917 Die Frau ohne Schatten.

For a while the instrument was "extraordinarily popular," its "'ethereal" qualities characteristic, along with instruments such as the nail violin and Aeolian harp, of Empfindsamkeit, but "the instrument fell into oblivion," around 1830. Since the armonica's performance revival during the 1980s, composers have again written for it (solo, chamber music, opera, electronic music, popular music) including Jan Erik Mikalsen, Regis Campo, Etienne Rolin, Philippe Sarde, Damon Albarn, Tom Waits, Michel Redolfi, Cyril Morin, Stefano Giannotti, Thomas Bloch, Jörg Widmann (Armonica 2006), and Guillaume Connesson.

The music for the 1997 ballet Othello by American composer Elliot Goldenthal opens and closes with the glass harmonica. The ballet was performed at San Francisco Ballet, the American Ballet Theatre, the Joffrey Ballet, and on tour in Europe including at the Opera Garnier with Dennis James performing with his historical replica instrument.

Joseph Schwantner's symphonic poem Aftertones of Infinity, which was awarded the 1979 Pulitzer Prize for Music, employed individual wine glasses played by numerous members of the orchestra at key points during the work.

George Benjamin's opera Written on Skin, which premiered at the 2012 Aix-en-Provence Festival, includes a prominent and elaborate part for the glass harmonica.

== Non-musical cultural works ==
Johann August Apel's short story "Der Geisterruf" ('The Ghost Call') from Gespensterbuch (volume 3, 1811) centers on the ethereal otherworldly quality of glass harmonicas.

Andrei Khrzhanovsky's 1968 animated short film The Glass Harmonica (Russian: Стеклянная гармоника) is named after, and features, a "glass harmonica". It is particularly notable for being the only Soviet animated film to be banned by censors.

== Purported dangers ==
The instrument's popularity did not last far beyond the 18th century. This may have been due to the inability to amplify the volume so as not to be drowned out by other instruments.

Some claim this was due to strange rumors that using the instrument caused both musicians and their listeners to go mad. It is a matter of conjecture how pervasive that belief was; all the commonly cited examples of this rumor seem to be German, if not confined to Vienna. One example of alleged effects from playing the glass harmonica was noted by German musicologist Johann Friedrich Rochlitz in the Allgemeine musikalische Zeitung:

[The harmonica] excessively stimulates the nerves, plunges the player into a nagging depression and hence into a dark and melancholy mood, that is an apt method for slow self-annihilation. ...

1. If you are suffering from any nervous disorder you should not play it.
2. If you are not yet ill you should not play it excessively.
3. If you are feeling melancholy you should not play it or else play uplifting pieces.

Marianne Davies, who played flute and harpsichord – and was a young woman said to be related to Franklin – became proficient enough at playing the armonica to offer public performances. After touring for many years in duo performances with her celebrated vocalist sister, she was also said to have been afflicted with a melancholia attributed to the plaintive tones of the instrument. Marianne Kirchgessner was an armonica player; she died at the age of 39 of pneumonia or an illness much like it. However many others, including Franklin, lived long lives.

For a time the armonica achieved a genuine vogue, but like most fads, that for the armonica eventually passed. It has been claimed the sound-producing mechanism did not generate sufficient power to fill the large halls that were becoming home to modern stringed instruments, brass, woodwinds, and percussion. That the instrument was made with glass, and subject to easy breakage, perhaps did not help either. By 1820, the armonica had mostly disappeared from frequent public performance, perhaps because musical fashions were changing.

A modern version of the "purported dangers" claims that players suffered lead poisoning because armonicas were made of lead glass. However, there is no known scientific basis for the theory that merely touching lead glass can cause lead poisoning. Lead poisoning was common in the 18th and early 19th centuries for both armonica players and non-players alike; doctors prescribed lead compounds for a long list of ailments, and lead or lead oxide was used as a food preservative and in cookware and eating utensils. Trace amounts of lead that armonica players in Franklin's day received from their instruments would likely have been dwarfed by lead from other sources, such as the lead-content paint used to mark visual identification of the bowls to the players.

Historical replicas by Eisch use so-called "White Crystal" developed in the 18th c. replacing the lead with a higher potash content; many modern newly invented devices, such as those made by Finkenbeiner, are made from so-called Quartz "pure silica glass" – a glass formulation developed in the early 20th c. for scientific purposes.

== Perception of the sound ==
The disorienting quality of the ethereal sound is due in part to the way that humans perceive and locate ranges of sounds. Above 4 kHz people primarily use the loudness of the sound to differentiate between left and right ears and thus triangulate, or locate the source. Below 1 kHz, they use the phase differences of sound waves arriving at their left and right ears to identify location. The predominant pitch of the armonica is in the range of 1–4 kHz, which coincides with the sound range where the brain is "not quite sure", and thus listeners have difficulty locating it in space (where it comes from), and discerning the source of the sound (the materials and techniques used to produce it).

Benjamin Franklin himself described the harmonica's tones as "incomparably sweet". The full quotation, written in a letter to Giambattista Beccaria, is: "The advantages of this instrument are that its tones are incomparably sweet beyond those of any other; that they may be swelled and softened at pleasure by stronger or weaker pressures of the finger, and continued to any length; and that the instrument, once well tuned, never again wants tuning."

A music critic for The Morning Chronicle, writing of a performance by Kirchgessner in 1794, said, "Her taste is chastened and the dulcet notes of the instrument would be delightful indeed, were they more powerful and articulate; but that we believe the most perfect execution cannot make them. In a smaller room and an audience less numerous, the effect must be enchanting. Though the accompaniments were kept very much under, they were still occasionally too loud."

== Modern revival ==
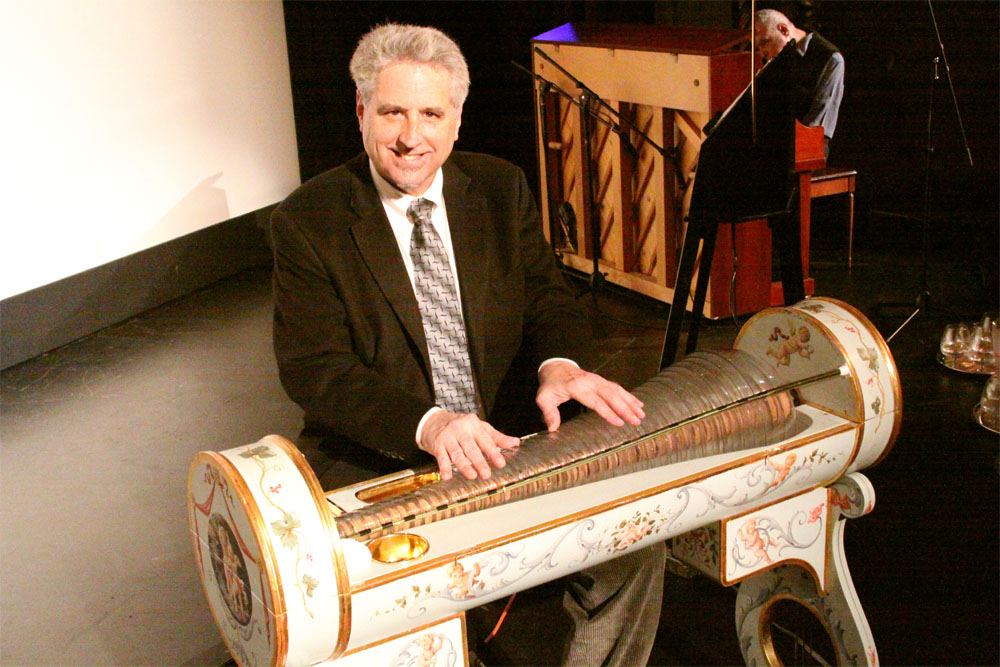
Dennis James plays the armonica at the Poncan Theatre in Ponca City, Oklahoma, on April 2, 2011.

Music for glass harmonica was rare from 1820 until the 1930s (although Gaetano Donizetti intended for the aria "Il dolce suono" from his 1835 opera Lucia di Lammermoor to be accompanied by a glass harmonica, and Richard Strauss specified use of the instrument in his 1919 opera Die Frau ohne Schatten), when German virtuoso Bruno Hoffmann began revitalizing interest in his individual goblet instrument version that he named the glass harp for his stunning performances. Playing his "glass harp" (with Eisch manufactured custom designed glasses mounted in a case designed with underlying resonance chamber) he transcribed or rearranged much of the literature written for the mechanized instrument, and commissioned contemporary composers to write new pieces for his goblet version.

Franklin's glass harmonica design was reworked yet again without patent credit by master glassblower and musician, Gerhard B. Finkenbeiner (1930–1999) in 1984. After thirty years of experimentation, Finkenbeiner's imitative prototype consisted of clear glasses and glasses later equipped with gold bands mimicking late 18th-century designs. The historical instruments with gold bands indicated the equivalent of the black keys on the piano, simplifying the multi-hued painted bowl rims with white accidentals as specified by Franklin. Finkenbeiner Inc., of Waltham, Massachusetts, continues to produce versions of these instruments commercially as of 2014, featuring glass elements made of scientific formulated fused-silica quartz.

From 1989 on to now, Sascha Reckert, a German glass instrumentalist and glass instrument producer, restored and reproduced glass armonicas from the original using crystal glass with full bass range, required for the original compositions. He did the first performance with glass armonica of Lucia die Lammermoor (Munich state opera) and Frau ohne Schatten in a full scene production, and invented the Verrophon with glass tubes, with a more powerful sound. Reckert also produced the harmonicas of Dennis James, the Wiener Glasharmonikaduo, Martin Hilmer and others.

French instrument makers and artists Bernard and François Baschet invented a modern variation of the Chladni Euphone in 1952, the "crystal organ" or Cristal di Baschet, which consists of up to 52 chromatically tuned resonating metal rods that are set into motion by attached glass rods that are rubbed with wet fingers. The Cristal di Baschet differs mainly from the other glass instruments in that the identical length and thickness glass rods are set horizontally, and attach to the tuned metal stems that have added metal blocks for increasing resonance. The result is a fully acoustic instrument, and impressive amplification obtained using fiberglass or metal cones fixed on wood and by a tall cut-out multi-resonant metal part in the shape of a flame. Some thin added metallic wires resembling cat whiskers are placed under the instrument, supposedly to increase the sound power of high-pitched frequencies.

Dennis James recorded an album of all glass music, Cristal: Glass Music Through the Ages co-produced by Linda Ronstadt and Grammy Award-winning producer John Boylan. James plays the glass harmonica, the Cristal di Baschet, and the Seraphim on the CD in original historical compositions and new arrangements for glass by Mozart, Scarlatti, Schnaubelt, and Fauré and collaborates on the recording with the Emerson String Quartet, operatic soprano Ruth Ann Swenson, and Ronstadt. James played glass instruments on Marco Beltrami's film scores for The Minus Man (1999) and The Faculty (1998). "I first became aware of glass instruments at about the age of 6 while visiting the Franklin Institute in Philadelphia. I can still recall being mesmerized by the appearance of the original Benjamin Franklin harmonica then on display in its own showcase in the entry rotunda of the city's famed science museum." When Ronstadt joined Dolly Parton and Emmylou Harris to make the 1999 album Trio II, Dennis James played the glass harmonica in their cover of "After the Gold Rush".

James Horner used a glass harmonica and pan flute for Spock's theme in the 1982 film Star Trek II: The Wrath of Khan. On February 23, 2007, the armonica was used by nu-metal band Korn while filming their session with MTV Unplugged. It was stated that it was of Benjamin Franklin's design. It was also used for the score of the 2026 feature film Project Hail Mary.

== Notable players ==
=== Historical ===
- Marie Antoinette
- Marianne Davies
- Benjamin Franklin (United States)
- Franz Mesmer
- Marianne Kirchgessner
- Christa Schönfeldinger
- Mrs. Philip Thicknesse (born Anne Ford), 1775, United Kingdom)
- Wiener Glasharmonika Duo

=== Contemporary ===
- Björk (Iceland)
- Thomas Bloch (France)
- Cecilia Brauer (USA)
- Nils Frahm (Germany)
- Bill Hayes (New York City) Broadway Musician and Percussionist, Barbra Streisand Orchestra 1994, 2006, 2007
- Martin Hilmer (Germany)
- Bruno Hoffmann (Germany)
- Dennis James (USA)
- Friedrich Heinrich Kern (United States/Germany)
- Alasdair Malloy (United Kingdom)
- David Mauldin (USA)
- Gloria Parker (USA) glass harp
- Gerald Schönfeldinger (Austria)
- Dean Shostak (USA)
- Ed Stander (USA)
- Robert Tiso (Italy)
- William Zeitler (United States)

== See also ==
- Cristal baschet
- Glass diatonic harmonica, a diatonic harmonica constructed from glass
- Hydraulophone
- Royal Commission on Animal Magnetism – 1784 French scientific bodies' investigations involving systematic controlled trials
- Sensitive style
- Singing bowl
- Verrophone
- Waterphone

== General and cited references ==
- "An Extensive Bibliography". of resources about the armonica.
- "Franklin, Benjamin". Franklin correspondence regarding the armonica. Archived from the original on February 10, 2007.
- "Galileo, Galilei". Passage from 'Two New Sciences' by Galileo about the 'wet finger around the wine glass' phenomenon (1638). Archived from the original on February 10, 2007.
- King, A.H., "The Musical Glasses and Glass Harmonica," Royal Musical Association, Proceedings, Vol.72, (1945/1946), pp. 97–122.
- Sterki, Peter. Klingende Gläser. Bern. NY 2000. ISBN 3-906764-60-5 br.
- History of the Glass Harmonica
