= Glass harp =

Musical instrument using glasses

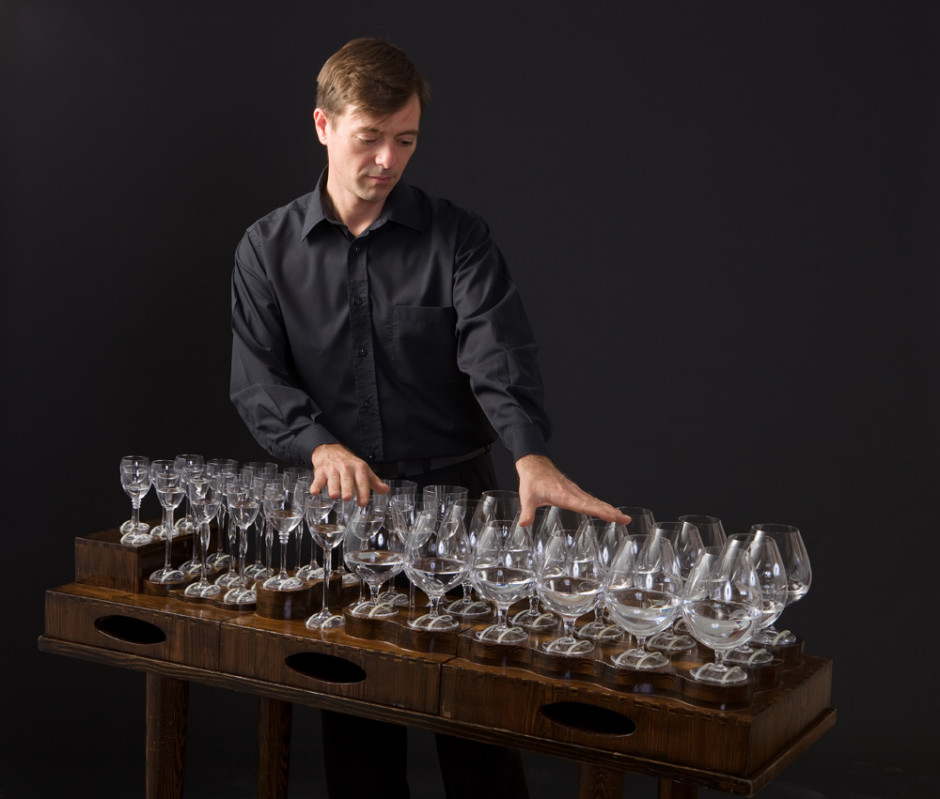
A glass harp being played by Robert Tiso. The rims of wine glasses filled with water are rubbed by the player's fingers to create the notes.

A glass harp (also called musical glasses, singing glasses, angelic organ, verrillon or ghost fiddle) is a musical instrument made of upright wine glasses.

It is played by running moistened or chalked fingers around the rim of the glasses. Each glass is tuned to a different pitch, either by grinding each goblet to the specified pitch, in which case the tuning is invariable, or by filling the glass with water until the desired pitch is achieved. Adding water causes the pitch to go down. Each glass model may have its pitch lowered by a fourth or even larger interval.

In addition, the sounds of a musical glass may be generated by bowing its rim with a bow for stringed instruments. In this case, a skilled musician may obtain the lowest tone (such as the one created by rubbing with the soaked finger) and also one or more higher notes, corresponding to the glass bowl higher modes.

== History ==
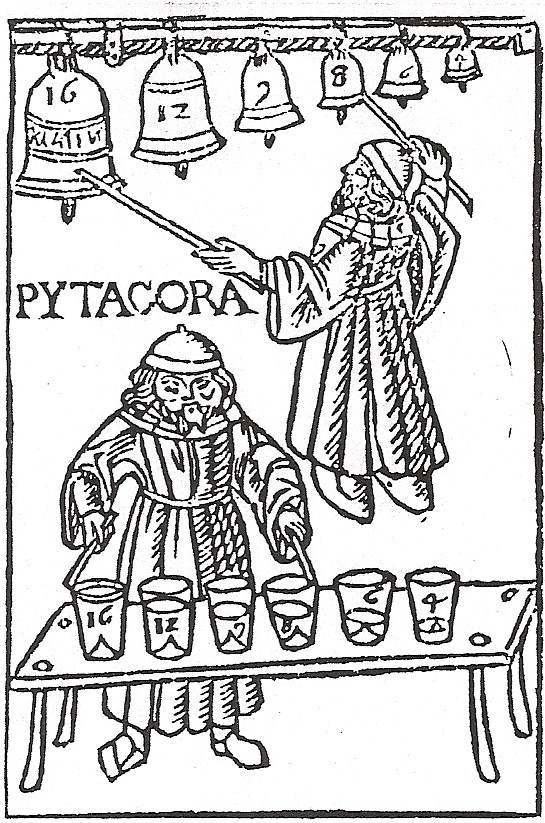
1492 Italian illustration of a person playing a glass harp

Musical glasses were documented in Persia in the 14th century. The glass harp was created in 1741 by Irishman Richard Pockrich, who is known as the first virtuoso of the musical glasses. Pockrich called his instrument the "angelic organ" and it was played with sticks, rather than by rubbing the glasses with a moistened finger. It was reported in 1760 that, "Pockrich played Handel's Water Music on the glasses." His successful concert career was brought to a premature end by a fire in which both the inventor and instrument perished in 1759.

The composer Christoph Willibald Gluck played the musical glasses. He performed in London in 1746, and Copenhagen. His instrument consisted of 26 goblets, "filled with spring water."

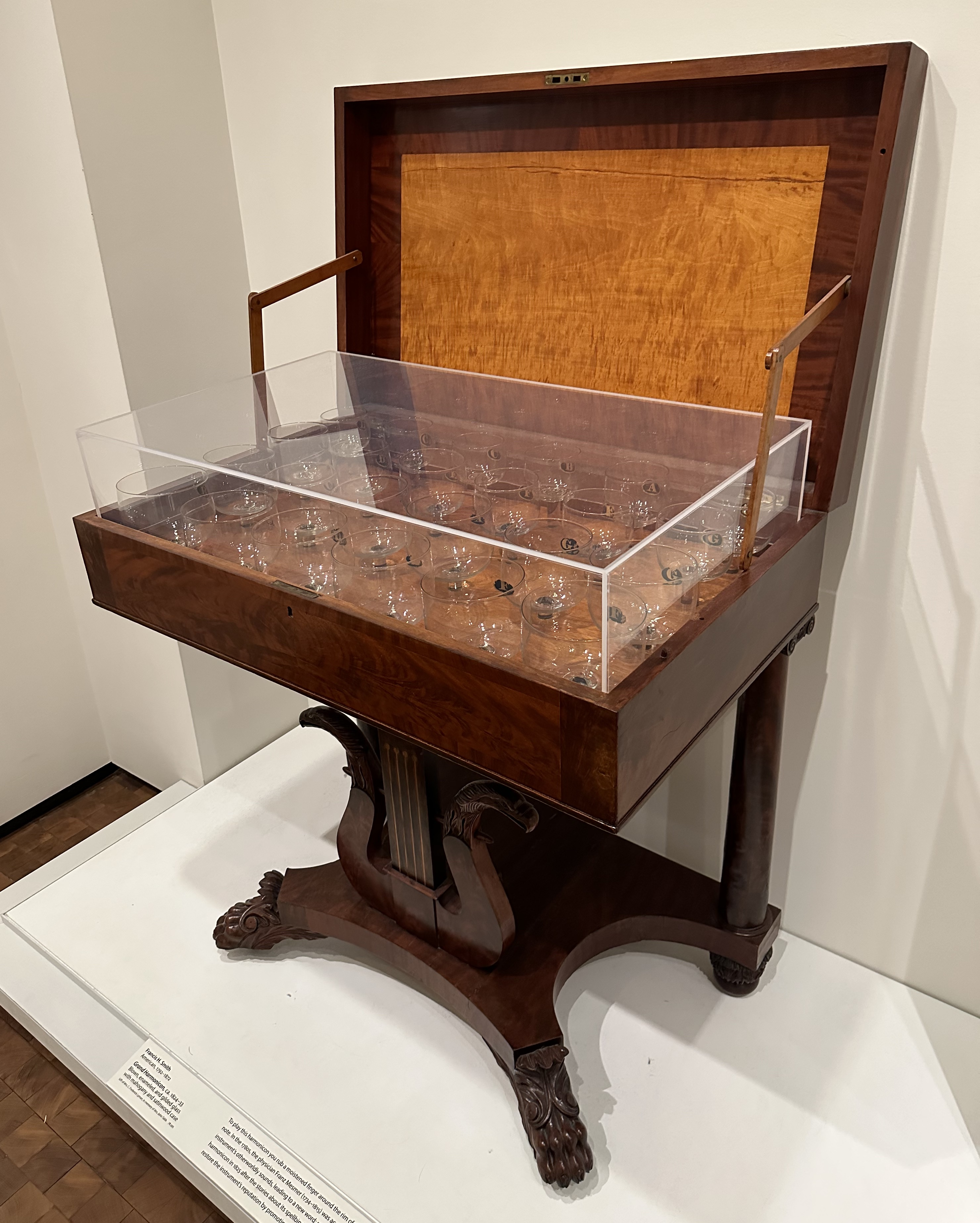
A Grand Harmonicon, a form of the glass harp invented by Francis Hopkinson Smith in 1825.

The instrument was popular in the 18th century. Pockrich's contemporary, Ford, published Instructions for the Playing of the Musical Glasses while Bartl published a German version. In 1929 Bruno Hoffmann invented a glass harp consisting, "of 46 individually tuned glasses fixed on a resonant table."

=== The Art of Instrumentation ===
This instrument, consisting of a number of tuned glasses, adapts itself excellently for the accompaniment of a zither, owing to its delicate tonal-quality. The following is its usual compass: [image: G_{3}-E_{6}] But some possess a compass of only two octaves from [image: C_{4}] to [image: C_{6}]. Its tone [timbre] is very similar to the harmonics of a Zither, and if treated skilfully can be easily produced, in all tonal-shadings, from the most delicate 'pianissimo' to a moderate 'forte.' It is very effective as a solo instrument, with the accompaniment of a muted string quartette. Only sustained songs and melodious passages are adapted for this instrument.

— Prof. Henri Kling, The Art of Instrumentation (1905)

This information about sustained 'songs and melodious passages' by Kling is incorrect in that if you listen to the Johann Friedrich Reichardt work played by Bruno Hoffmann from the 1960s recording, you will hear quick and clearly articulated staccato notes and runs.

== Contemporary uses ==
In 1924, radio station WLAG (Minneapolis-St. Paul) broadcast musical glasses performances by Olin Wold and "Mrs. J. Albert Huseby."

On March 9, 1938, Bruno Hoffmann performed on the glass harp at the London Museum in a program including Mozart's Adagio (K. 356) and Quintet for harmonica, flute, viola, oboe, and cello (K. 617), accompanied by Geoffrey Gilbert, Leon Goossens, Frederick Riddle, and James Whitehead. It was an "exquisite performance, in which the flute and viola in their upper registers were almost indistinguishable from the glasses, [which] held spell-bound a large audience, crowded over the floor, stairs and galleries".

On February 18, 1979, Gloria Parker performed as a musical glasses soloist with the Hartford Symphony Orchestra at the Jai alai fronton in Hartford, Connecticut. Richard Hayman, noted for his arrangements for Boston Pops conductor Arthur Fiedler, was the guest conductor for the 90-piece orchestra that accompanied the musical glasses which included songs such as "Lara's Theme" from the movie Dr. Zhivago, "Lover" and "Amor".

There are several current musicians who professionally play the glass harp. Among them are the Glass Duo from Poland, Philipp Marguerre and Clemens Hofinger in Germany, France's Jean Chatillion and Thomas Bloch, Brien Engel, and Dennis James in the United States and Canada's Real Berthiaume.

Glasses have been also used by rock band Pink Floyd during the recording of "Shine On You Crazy Diamond" on their Wish You Were Here album, recorded and released in 1975. Igor Sklyarov played the glass harp on the song during two 2006 concerts recorded in Venice, Italy, by guitarist David Gilmour. Gilmour also used the effect during his August 26, 2006, concert in Gdańsk, Poland, with the help of Guy Pratt, Phil Manzanera and Dick Parry. Both recordings are available on Gilmour's Live in Gdańsk CD, although the Venice recording is only available on the five-disc version of the album or as an internet download with the three- and four-disc versions. Peter Gabriel uses the instrument during his song "And Still" on his eighth album i/o, released in 2023.

A colorful set of water tuned glasses is depicted as being played with a pair of metal sticks in several key scenes of the 2009 Korean TV drama Queen Seon Deok, showing the series' main anti-heroine Mishil (Go Hyun-jung), playing her own haunting theme melody Yurijan (Glasses) on that instrument.

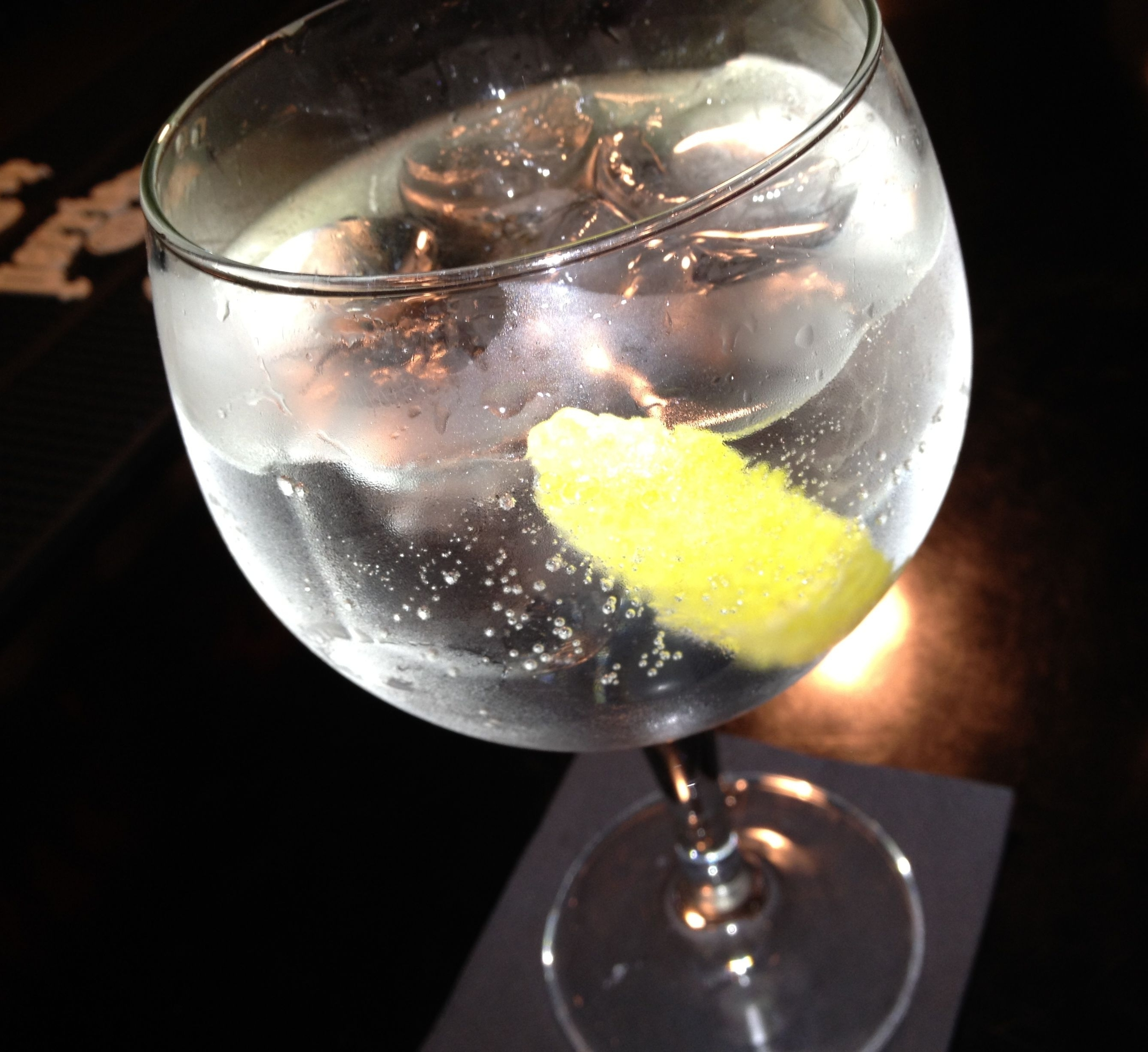
Gin and tonic large glass with a long and thin stem, which may be used to produce a rim sound and a base sound if rubbed properly

A Toast To Christmas with the Singing Glasses is an album recorded and released in 1980, composed and performed by Gloria Parker. Fourteen well-known carols are performed with the glass harp producing flute-like sounds on crystal glasses, marking the first commercial album to use glasses as a musical instrument.

Recently, there have been new advancements in the popular use of the glass harp. British musician and composer Jacob Collier developed a similar instrument for his own productions in 2016.

== Glass base (foot) vibration ==
Not only the rim of a wine glass may be rubbed to produce sounds, but also its base (foot), provided the stem is sufficiently long. This can be easily demonstrated by taking a glass for gin and tonic, for instance, with a large bowl and a rather long stem.

== See also ==
- Glass harmonica
- Jal tarang
- Stick-slip phenomenon
