= Baschet =

Baschet is a French surname. Notable people with the surname include:

- Baschet Brothers, French musical instrument makers François Baschet (1920–2014) and Bernard Baschet (1917–2015)
- Marcel Baschet (1862–1941), French painter

== See also ==
- Cristal baschet, musical instrument
