= Guillem de Cabestany =

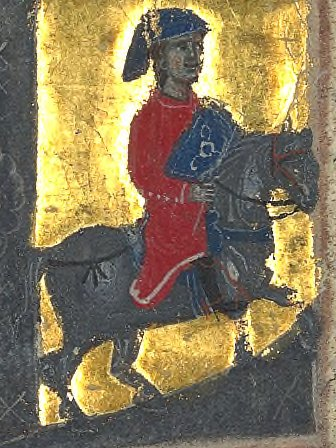
Miniature of Guillem de Cabestany

Guillem de Cabestany (Catalan pronunciation: [ɡiˈʎɛm də kəβəsˈtaɲ]; 1162–1212) was a Catalan troubadour from Cabestany in the County of Roussillon. He is often known by his Old Occitan name, Guilhem de Cabestaing, Cabestang, Cabestan, or Cabestanh (Old Occitan: [ɡiˈʎɛm de kabesˈtaɲ]).

== Life ==
There is not much reliable information that is known about Guillem de Cabestany. He is probably the son of Arnau de Cabestany, a noble of Roussillon, and a vassal in relation with the lords of Castell Rosselló. Cabestany itself is a fief located immediately next to the east of Castell Rosselló and southwest of Canet (a future viscounty).

According to Pere Tomich, Guillem de Cabestany fought alongside Peter II of Aragon at the Battle of Las Navas de Tolosa against the Almohads in 1212.

== Legend ==
According to his legendary vida, he was the lover of Margarida or Seremonda (or Soremonda), wife of Raimon of Castell Rosselló. On discovering their affair, Raimon fed Cabestany's heart to Seremonda. When he told her what she had eaten, she threw herself from the window to her death.

The vida precedes Cabestany's poem Lo dous cossire in his Chansonnier I. It is translated alongside the Old Occitan in Margarita Egan's 1984 edition The vidas of the troubadours.

Versions of this legend appear later in Giovanni Boccaccio's Decameron (1348–53), Stendhal's On Love (1822), and in Ezra Pound's Canto IV (1924–25). It also inspired the opera Written on Skin (2012) by George Benjamin and Martin Crimp.

Seremonda is thought to have been married two or three times, first to Raimon of Castell Rosselló, to another husband in 1210, and then to Aymar de Mosset. De Mosset probably fought alongside Cabestany in the Battle of Las Navas de Tolosa in 1212. Raimon himself lived peacefully in Castell Rosselló until at least 1218.

Medievalist John E. Matzke has identified at least fourteen different versions of the "eaten heart" legend in several different literary traditions. Cabestany's vida may not be the earliest version.

With reference to regional historian Jules Canonge, Cabestany is presented as the archetypal troubador in Ford Madox Ford's book Provence.

== Known works ==
Some of Cabestany's poems were published along with his vida by François-Juste-Marie Raynouard in 1816.

All of Cabestany's works have been published by Michel Adroher in side-by-side Old Occitan and Modern French. Nine extant songs are attributed to Cabestany, of which two are uncertain.

== Sources ==
- Adroher, Michel (2012). Les Troubadours roussillonnais (in French). Pézilla-la-Rivière: Publications de l'olivier. ISBN 9782908866421.
- Cárdena, Fabricio (2014). 66 petites histoires du Pays Catalan [66 Little Stories of Catalan Country] (in French). Perpignan: Ultima Necat. ISBN 978-2-36771-006-8. OCLC 893847466.
- Egan, Margarita (1984). The vidas of the troubadours. New York; London: Garland. p. 103. ISBN 978-0824094379.
- Matzke, John E. (January 1911). "The Legend of the Eaten Heart". Modern Language Notes. 1 (26): 1–8. doi:10.2307/2915976. JSTOR 2915976.
