= Dennis James (musician) =

American musician (born 1950)

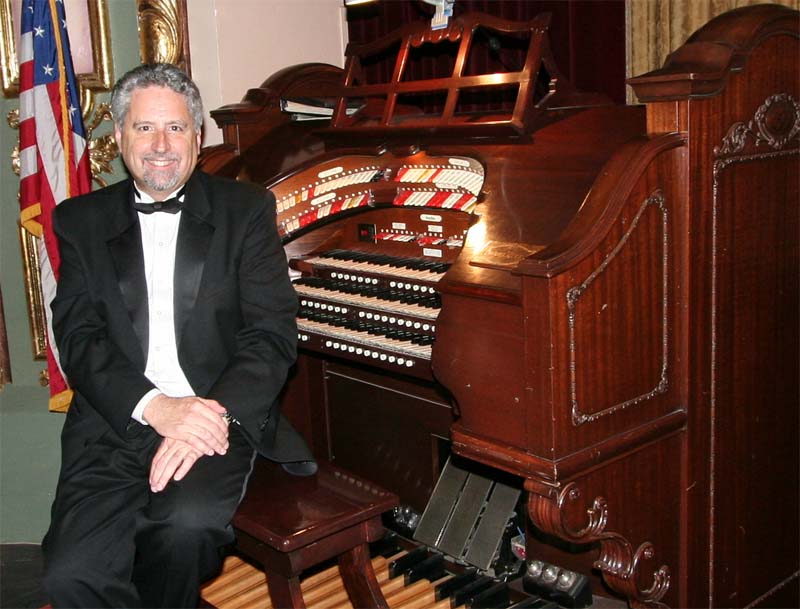
James at the keyboard of the Mighty Wurlitzer at the Coleman Theater in Miami, Oklahoma in September 2007, where he played the score for Clara Bow's 1927 film It

Dennis James (born 1950) is an American musician and historic preservationist. Beginning in 1969, he presented historically informed live accompaniments for silent films, with piano, theatre organ, chamber ensemble and full symphony orchestras, throughout the United States, Canada, Mexico and overseas. He is now primarily active as a noted multi-instrumentalist, specializing on Franklin glass armonica and the theremin, prominently performing in New York at the Metropolitan Opera, for Hollywood film scorings, and repeat performances at Lincoln Center's Mostly Mozart Festival (debuting in 1991 with Roger Norrington and the London Classical Players) plus performing at the Tanglewood Festival with the Boston Symphony Orchestra performing the intricate glass armonica complete part in the U.S. debut of George Benjamin's opera "Written on Skin".

James has also become active in the preservation and restoration of other historic instruments such as the French Cristal Baschet and Ondes Martenot plus has begun performing early syncopated jazz and mid-century moderne styled period-piano repertoire within a multitude of other specialist musical activities generally considered of marginal cultural impact and predominantly subject to the periodic whims of amateurs and enthusiasts.

== Early musical training ==
James was born in Philadelphia, in 1950. He began formal organ training at the age of 12. At the age of 16, he replaced his teacher, Leonard MacClain, in concert after MacClain suffered a heart attack before the performance, which placed him on an international touring circuit. James attended Indiana University's School of Music as a student of concert and church organ performance, earning his bachelor's and master's degrees under the tutelage of Dr. Oswald G. Ragatz.

James' interest in silent film performance with live music dates from 1969 at the Tower Theatre in Upper Darby Township, Pennsylvania. As James recalls, "The late 'Flicker Fingers' himself, California touring theatre organist Gaylord Carter, was at the Wurlitzer theatre pipe organ console and on the screen Douglas Fairbanks, Sr. in The Mark of Zorro. In classic 'Chorus Line' fashion, I turned to my Dad at the end and said 'I can do that!'"

== Silent film organ performance ==
James began performing films in October, 1969 and soon in full scale revival performances together with symphony orchestras beginning in 1971. From 1975 to 1989, James was "Resident Organist for the Ohio Theatre" in Columbus, Ohio having revived a bygone era professional position vacated in 1942. James had his organ concerto with orchestra debut with the Chicago Symphony at Orchestra Hall in 1984. James toured in the 1980s with silent film stars Lillian Gish and Charles ‘Buddy’ Rogers, providing musical accompaniment on national tour revivals of their motion pictures. The New York Times reported on December 13, 1981 that James would play at the recently restored Pascack Theater in Westwood, New Jersey, a deluxe movie house with facilities for stage productions and a specially built Wurlitzer pipe organ for accompanying silent films. James "follows the technique and style of the old-time accompanists, cueing the music exactly to the action and mood on the screen."

=== Organ performance positions ===
James currently is the appointed (2010) "Theatre Organist for the Washington Center" a professional position in the Washington Center for the Performing Arts in Olympia, Washington, the appointed (2010) "House Organist" for the Historic Coleman Theatre, Miami, Oklahoma, the Cinequest Festival silent film organist for California Theatre in San Jose, California, and Silent Film organist for the Stanford Theatre in Palo Alto, California.

=== Production company ===
James performs under the aegis of his own production companies, Crystal City Music and Silent Film Concerts. James has assembled one of the largest private libraries of authentic period-published historical scores and generic historical music in existence (including complete original film scores and hundreds of published generic silent film music compositions that he uses to create compiled musical scores for his recreations where the originals do not survive).

=== Tours ===
James has accompanied silent films at the Pordenone and Rome Silent Film Festivals, Cinema Muto, the British Film Institute, Salzburg's Mozarteum, Vienna's Konzerthaus, three sellout screenings at the Sydney Opera House as well as appearances for special film exhibitions at the Louvre and his popular annual Stummfilm Series begun in 2011 for the Mozarteum in Salzburg, Austria. His scorings have been commissioned for archive-presented performances and recordings of silent films for the American Film Institute, National Film Registry, New York Museum of Modern Art, the Library of Congress, Pacific Film Archive, George Eastman House, American Federation of the Arts, the UCLA Film and Television Archive, and the British Film Institute.

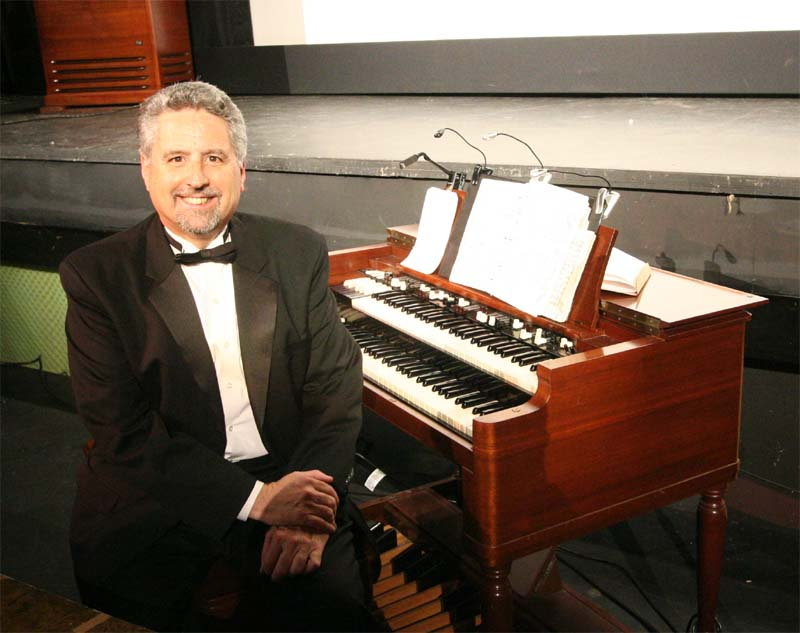
Dennis James at the Poncan Theatre in Ponca City, Oklahoma for his special commission of the 1925 Silent Film Tumbleweeds about the Cherokee Strip land rush as part of a celebration of the one-hundredth anniversary of Oklahoma statehood

=== Commissions ===
In 1991 James was commissioned by the BFI to score the 1924 Soviet science fiction spectacle Aelita, Queen of Mars and he decided to include period-texture sound effects to the score produced from an original 1929 RCA theremin that he had restored by Robert Moog. "I contacted Clara Rockmore, the leading virtuosa of the instrument still then living in New York, who taught me to play it. Then I began performing my Aelita film score all over the world, from the Louvre in Paris to the British Film Institute in London and the National Gallery in D.C." In addition to scoring the theremin for Aelita, Queen of Mars, James has utilized the theremin for Fritz Lang's now-restored silent films Metropolis and Woman in the Moon at the National Gallery of Art in Washington, D.C. Recent tour seasons include collaboration with historic keyboard specialist Michael Tsalka touring as the Duo Filmharmonia performing all classical repertoire scorings, commissioned initially by the National Gallery of Art in Washington, D.C., to the restored 1921 German version of The Asta Nielsen “Hamlet”, with Danish actress Asta Nielsen. That "historical compilation scoring is made up solely of excerpted compositions by the sons of [Johann Sebastian] Bach performed in a keyboard duo-performers format utilizing three instruments (organ, fortepiano, harpsichord) and a guest mezzo-soprano vocalist." The duo also scored and performed on tour the preserved Marion Davies “Janice Meredith” and the Conrad Veidt “Hands of Orlac” silent films.

On September 14, 2007, James performed the score to Tumbleweeds in a live performance at the Poncan Theater (built in 1923) in Ponca City, Oklahoma as a special commission as part of a celebration of the one-hundredth anniversary of Oklahoma Statehood.

== Glass armonica performance ==
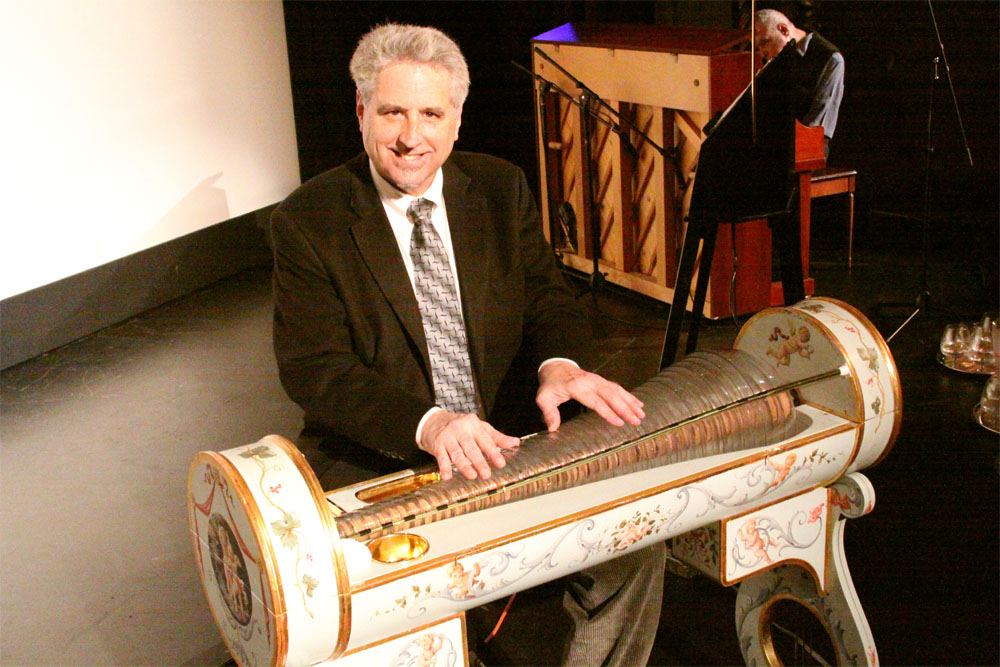
Dennis James plays the Franklin Glass Armonica at the Poncan Theatre in Ponca City, Oklahoma on April 2, 2011.

James plays the Franklin glass armonica and has collected other vitreous music instruments including several Francis Hopkinson Smith's 19th century Grand Harmonicons, one of the few surviving Beyer 18th c. Glass-cords, and modern glass instrument inventions such as verrophone, the Cristal Baschet, along with a wide variety of glass flutes and glass bells. He is currently constructing an expanded version of the French Bouteillophone creating a touring continuo instrument for 18th c. ensemble repertoire plus developing his own glass instrument invention, the Mesmerphone. James played his glass instruments on Marco Beltrami's film scores for The Minus Man (1999) and The Faculty (1998). "I first became aware of glass instruments at about the age of 6 while visiting the Franklin Institute in Philadelphia. I can still recall being mesmerized by the appearance of the original Benjamin Franklin armonica then on display in its own showcase in the entry rotunda of the city's famed science museum.". In the interest of historical and philological accuracy, James adheres to Franklin's original name, "armonica" without the "h".

From 2010 to 2015 James served as the initial appointed Lecturer in glass music studies at the Mason Gross School of the Arts at Rutgers University in New Brunswick, New Jersey, designing a glass music studies program that including graduate level student instruction in Seraphim and Armonica (the first such academic appointment in the history of the field). James performed glass armonica contributions to six of Linda Ronstadt's popular music CD album projects, including Winter Light and the Grammy Award-winning "Dedicated to the One I Love" and "Trio II" featuring Dolly Parton and EmmyLou Harris. "Linda explained she had first heard the sounds of rubbed glass some 15 years before, just where, though, escapes her to this day. She kept that ethereal sound in her mind all those years and it was during the orchestra sessions and post-session mix on the track "A River for Him", written by Emmylou Harris, that Linda had the inspiration to add the glass tones", says James. James appeared on Late Night with David Letterman with Ronstadt. "It was a great surprise. A sort of unspoken message in the air to me before the broadcast was 'Do not say anything on the air!' After all, these things are Linda's appearances. When David Letterman leaned over his desk and directed a question to me I simply froze – on playback of the dub I can see myself caught and unable to speak. I received a glance from Linda that said to me it was OK and so when he tried again I called back a flip one liner and on things went from there", says James.

James recorded for Sony-Classical release an album Featuring several glass music instruments, Cristal: Glass Music Through the Ages co-produced by Ronstadt and Grammy Award-winning producer John Boylan. James plays the glass armonica, the cristal and the seraphim on the CD in original historical compositions for glass by Mozart, Scarlatti, Schnaubelt, and Fauré. James collaborates with the Emerson String Quartet, operatic soprano Ruth Ann Swenson, and Ronstadt.

== Discography ==
- Dennis James at the "Fotoplayer"
- Dennis James at the Movies. Ohio Theatre Summer Series (1975)
- Dennis James at the Movies. Ohio Theatre Summer Series, Vol 2. (1977)
- Dennis James Classic Theatre Organ (1985), recorded on the Morton organs at the Ohio Theater in Columbus, and Forum Theatre in New York.
- Dennis James at the RTOS Wurlitzer
- Dennis & Heidi James – Puttin' on the Ritz
- Cristal: Glass Music Through the Ages (2002)
