= Iurii Iushkevich =

Russian countertenor

- Born: Saint Petersburg
- Education: Berlin University of the Arts; University of the Arts in Graz
- Occupation: Operatic countertenor

Iurii Iushkevich is a Russian countertenor who made an international career after achieving prizes at international competitions.

== Life and career ==
Born in Saint Petersburg, he studied voice at the Berlin University of the Arts with Enrico Facini, and at the University of the Arts in Graz with Elena Pankratova. He won the Elena Obraztsova competition in his home town in 2012, was awarded a prize at the Crescendo International Music Competition in New York City, and won the 2019 Triomphe de l'Art competition in Brussels.

Iushkevich was a member of the Young Singers Project of the Salzburg Festival, performing in 2019 as Hippogryph and Astolfo in Marius Felix Lange's children's opera Der Gesang der Zauberinsel. He made his debut at the Vienna State Opera in 2022 as Shepherd in Monteverdi's L'Orfeo, followed by the lead role of Ich in the world premiere of Johannes Kalitzke's Kapitän Nemos Bibliothek, co-produced by the Bregenzer Festspiele and the Schwetzingen Festival. The production with the Ensemble Modern was recorded. He appeared at the Erl festival in 2023 as Lel in Rimsky-Korsakov's The Snow Maiden, and as Nireno in Handel's Giulio Cesare at the Oper Frankfurt. He performed there in 2025 as the Queen's Servant in Aribert Reimann's L'Invisible, and as at the Salzburg Festival as Arbate in Mozart's Mitridate, re di Ponto. He performed the double role of First Angel and The Boy in Benjamin's Written on Skin in Frankfurt in 2026, directed by Tatjana Gürbaca and conducted by Erik Nielsen, alongside Bo Skovhus as The Protector and Elizabeth Reiter as Agnès. A reviewer named him an ideal choice for the angelic intruder, with a voice of "weightless, almost otherworldly beauty", yet also a "sorrowful groundedness" in the lower registers, mastering the extreme high notes with ease.
