= Susan Bickley =

British classical singer

- Born: Liverpool, UK
- Education: Guildhall School of Music and Drama
- Occupation: Operatic mezzo-soprano

Susan Bickley is a British mezzo-soprano singer who performs in opera, Baroque and contemporary classical music.

== Personal life and education ==
Susan Rochford Bickley was born in Liverpool, England. Her father was a primary school deputy headmaster and her mother was a special needs teacher. Her younger brother Graham Bickley is an actor and singer. Bickley and her brother first began singing in church as children, accompanied by their father on the organ. She attended Quarry Bank Comprehensive School in Liverpool and then studied music at City University and the Guildhall School of Music and Drama. She later studied singing with Audrey Langford. In 1984 she married Anthony Castro and they have two children.

== Voice ==
Bickley's voice is in the mezzo-soprano range. It has been described as having considerable range and expressivity. When singing the dual roles of Juno and Ino in Handel's Semele with Concerto Köln in 2015, her performance was reviewed in Opera magazine: "... Juno and Ino were both sung by Susan Bickley, a double act which she carried off both vocally and dramatically. Her mezzo tones were smooth and even for the rather downtrodden Ino, and quite ferocious for the vengeful Juno."

== Career ==
Bickley first appeared with the Royal Opera in London in 1991 as Fyodor in Mussorgsky's Boris Godunov and has subsequently appeared in more than ten other productions with the company. These include as Lyudmila in Smetana's The Bartered Bride, Mrs Peacham in The Beggar’s Opera, Old Countess in Shostakovitch's The Nose in 2016 and in 2018/19 both Second Harlot and the Queen of Sheba in Handel's Solomon (in concert) and Marfa in Janáček's Katya Kabanova.

She has performed in ten productions with the English National Opera including the world premieres of Barry's The Bitter Tears of Petra von Kant in 2005, as Detective Inspector Anne Strawson in Muhly and Lucas's Two Boys in 2011 and The Winter's Tale composed by Wigglesworth in 2017. She appeared with this company also as Herodias in Salome by Richard Strauss, Eduige in Handel's Rodelinda, Mescalina in Ligeti's Le Grand Macabre, Cassandra in Berlioz's Les Troyens and as Marcellina in Mozart's The Marriage of Figaro in 2020.

Bickley has also performed with other opera companies including Opera North, Welsh National Opera and at Glyndebourne in 2016 as Marcellina in Le nozze di Figaro. She has appeared in concert productions with many orchestras and also on radio such as the BBC. She has recorded with several organisations including EMI Classics, Hyperion and Deutsche Grammophon. Her first recording, in 1987 with the Hilliard Ensemble, included Arbos by Pärt, performing an alto part.

Her appearances outside the UK included the roles of Minister and the Minister’s Wife in Benjamin's Into the Little Hill at Lincoln Center, New York City, U.S., in 2015 and the Ghost in the premiere of Birtwistle's The Last Supper with the Berlin State Opera in 2000.

== Awards ==
Bickley gained the Gold Medal for singers in 1981 during her studies at the Guildhall School of Music and Drama. In May 2011 she received the Singer Award from the Royal Philharmonic Society in recognition of her performance in live classical music in the UK.
