= Into the Little Hill =

2006 UK opera

- Chamber opera by George Benjamin
- Librettist: Martin Crimp
- Language: English
- Based on: legend of the Pied Piper of Hamelin
- Premiere: 22 November 2006; Opéra Bastille, Paris

Into the Little Hill is a 2006 chamber opera by British composer George Benjamin.

Described by the composer as a "lyric tale in two parts", the libretto is by playwright Martin Crimp and it is Benjamin's first stage work. They have since collaborated on a further two operas, Written on Skin (2012) and Lessons in Love and Violence (2018). All three works draw upon medieval subject matter in some way, and Into the Little Hill is a modern retelling of the legend of the Pied Piper of Hamelin. Crimp has stated that he was introduced to Benjamin by musicologist Laurence Dreyfus.

The piece was commissioned by Festival d'Automne à Paris. It premiered at Opéra Bastille on 22 November 2006, conducted by Franck Ollu, directed by Daniel Jeanneteau, and performed by Anu Komsi and Hilary Summers with instrumentalists from Ensemble Modern. It has since been performed in over 100 productions in Europe, North America, China, Australia. It is approximately 40 minutes in length.

== Scoring ==
=== Roles ===
Into the Little Hill is scored for one soprano and one alto, each representing different roles between scenes:

Soprano	Alto
The Crowd	The Crowd
The Stranger	Narrator
Narrator	The Minister
The Minister's Child	The Minister's Wife
The Children	The Mothers

The use of two singers has drawn comparison with Herbert Parry's setting of Robert Browning's 1842 poem "The Pied Piper of Hamelin", which casts a tenor as the Piper and a baritone as the Mayor.

Crimp's libretto uses a mixture of direct and reported speech. Elisabeth Angel-Perez describes this technique as "self-narration", noting its elision of more traditional operatic forms of recitative and aria as well as its extensive use in Written on Skin.

Benjamin makes versatile use of vocal register for characterization. High, simple soprano writing is used to convey the innocence of the Child, while more extreme coloratura passages represent the other-worldliness of the Stranger. The alto line makes considerable use of low tessitura to convey the Minister's masculinity and the Mother's lamentations.

=== Instrumentation ===
- Bass flute (doubling flute and piccolo), two basset horns in F, contrabass clarinet
- Two cornets, trombone
- Cimbalom
- Percussion: cymbals, guiro, whip, 2 crotales
- Two violins (second doubling mandolin), two violas (second doubling banjo), two cellos, double bass (lowest string tuned to C)

Several reviewers have remarked upon Benjamin's orchestration, particularly the cimbalom's "eerie" quality and the unusual timbres of the contrabass clarinet and basset horn. The use of traditionally non-orchestral instruments such as the cornet, mandolin and banjo has been interpreted as an evocation of the folk origins of the story, while the extended obbligato passages on the bass flute imply the Pied Piper's flute.

== Synopsis ==
=== Part One ===
The opera opens with the angry Crowd calling for the extermination of the rats in their town. The Minister suggests that they try to coexist peacefully with the rats, but the people insist singing, "kill and you have our vote".

At night, the Minister finds a mysterious man in his daughter's bedroom. The Stranger has "no eyes, no nose, no ears", and offers to charm the rats away in exchange for a large sum of money. The Minister offers to pay twice as much if he is re-elected, and the Stranger forces him to swear on the bargain by his sleeping child.

After an instrumental interlude, the Minister's Child asks the Mother why the rats have to die, becoming agitated as she describes them wearing clothes and carrying suitcases and babies. The Mother reassures her that they will "die with dignity".

=== Part Two ===
The Minister is re-elected and the Stranger comes to his office to collect his payment. When the Minister insists that the rats "chose to leave of their own free will" and refuses to pay, the Stranger reminds him of their bargain and leaves.

After another musical interlude, the townspeople discover that their children are missing. The Mother confronts the Minister, asking "where is my child?". The Children respond that they are "inside the Little Hill ... with the angel under the earth".

== Critical reception ==
Into the Little Hill has been variously interpreted as a commentary on contemporary attitudes to immigration, a "satire on the way power corrupts" and "the tabloid fetishisation of the disappearance of children", a metaphor for genocide, a commentary on government cuts to arts funding, and a "parable about the power of music". Because they are coded as socially undesirable and described with clothes and suitcases, the plight of the rats has been read by several commentators as a reference to the Holocaust.

Because of its ambiguous text and frequent role changes, the opera is usually staged very sparsely, and has been described as a "secular oratorio".

The opera has been widely well-received, described by Rupert Christiansen as "a startling miracle of originality". Critics have praised the piece's concision of both Crimp and Benjamin's writing, favourably comparing the opera to chamber works by Benjamin Britten, Judith Weir and Harrison Birtwistle.

Less positive reviews cite the alienating effect of the narrative style and its cryptic modes of expression, describing it as dramatically "non-committal".
