= Tumbleweeds (1925 film) =

American silent Western film

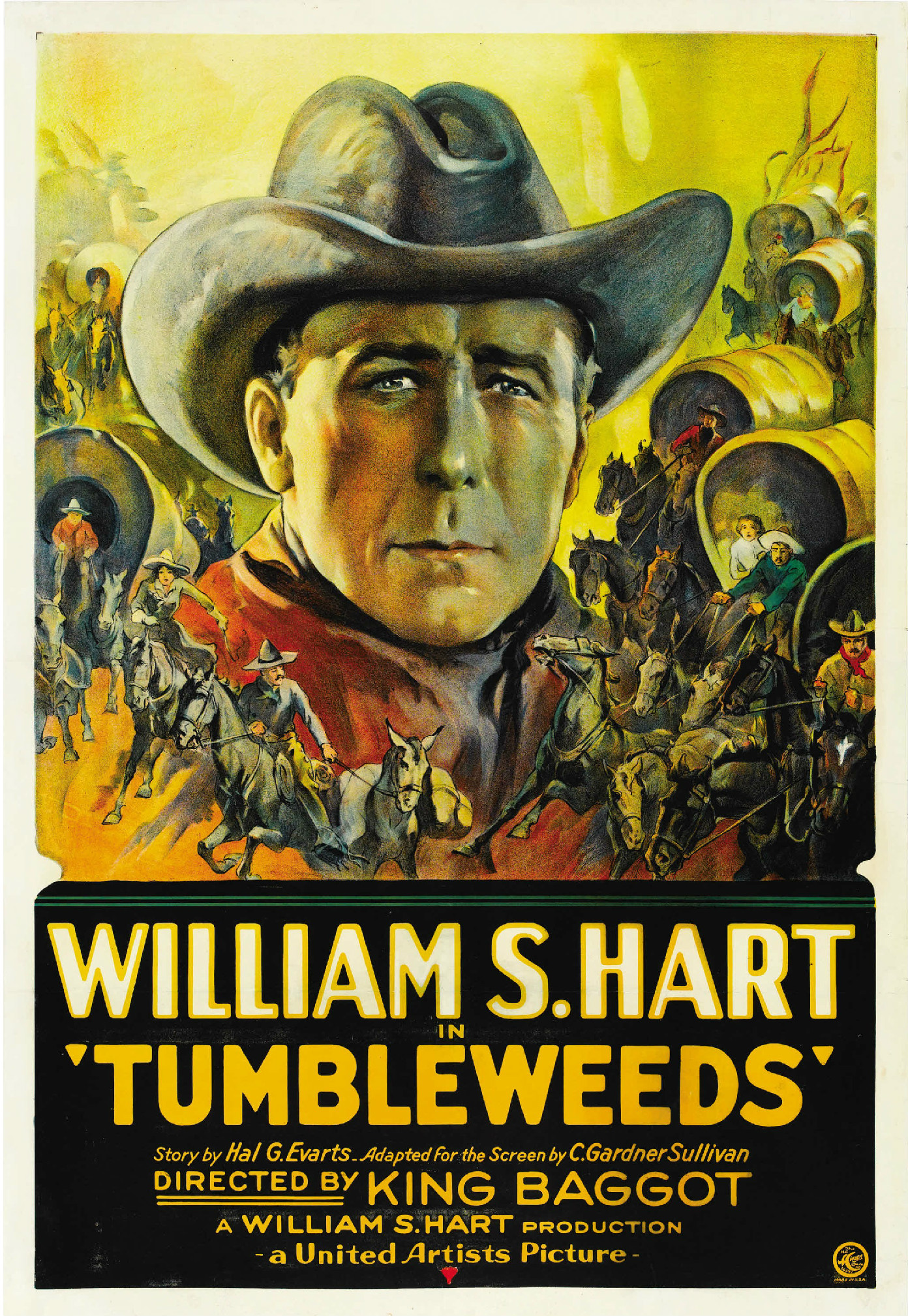
- Theatrical poster
- Directed by: King Baggot
- Written by: Hal G. Evarts; C. Gardner Sullivan
- Produced by: William S. Hart
- Starring: William S. Hart
- Cinematography: Joseph August
- Distributed by: United Artists
- Release date: December 27, 1925
- Running time: 78 minutes
- Country: United States
- Languages: Silent; English intertitles

Tumbleweeds

The 1939 rerelease version, with an 8-minute intro by Hart and an added synchronized soundtrack

Tumbleweeds is a 1925 American silent Western film starring and produced by William S. Hart. It depicts the Cherokee Strip land rush of 1893. The film is said to have influenced the Oscar-winning 1931 Western Cimarron, which also depicts the land rush. The 1939 Astor Pictures' re-release of Tumbleweeds includes an 8-minute introduction by the then 74-year-old Hart as he talks about his career and the "glories of the old west." Tumbleweeds was Hart's last movie.

== Plot ==
Set in Caldwell, Kansas on the Kansas-Oklahoma border, the film begins with intertitles describing the end of the reign of cowboys and cattle on the open range that would soon become farmland and homesteads. Cowboys sing of their rambling lifestyle as "tumbleweeds." And one of those tumbleweeds is their foreman Don Carver (William S. Hart), who respects the rattlesnakes and wolves that roam the prairie more than the land-grabbers who will soon be arriving.

The cattle are being gathered at the home ranch of the Box K, where Carver drops off a couple of orphaned wolf pups before heading south to get details on the coming land rush. Cowhand Kentucky Rose (Lucien Littlefield) asks to accompany the foreman, and together they ride to the cow-town of Caldwell, population 200. That's where the "advance guard" of the homesteaders is gathering at the Kansas-Oklahoma border.

Kentucky meets a widow named Mrs. Riley (Lillian Leighton), who has come to claim a new homestead for her three children. The cowpoke helps her fix a slipped rein on the team of horses that pulls her covered wagon. As she pulls out to catch up with the rest of the advance guard, Kentucky sighs and says maybe these homesteaders are alright after all. But Carver can't wait to get back to his cows, which by government order need to be moved off the rich grazing land.

On the trail drive west, the Box K crew comes across other ranchers moving their herd off the Cherokee Strip—the Triple X outfit, the Circle Dot and the Diamond Bar. Carver says, "Boys, it's the end of the West." And sure enough, the influx of would-be settlers turns little Caldwell into a teeming city almost overnight. That's where Carver has a run in with hooligan who was bullying a puppy-toting boy named Bart (Jack Murphy). Carver gives the hombre an impromptu lesson in proper manners.

After getting soaked in a horse trough by the cowman, the bully meets an old buddy who now goes by the name Bill Freel (Richard Neill). They start planning to illegally stake a claim to the Box K ranch. Meanwhile, Carver takes the round-up report to his boss, Joe Hinman (James Gordon), who treats him and Kentucky to some whisky in the local saloon. The boss also suggests that Carver might want to get a piece of land for himself and settle down, but the cowboy says the only land he will ever settle on will bear his tombstone.

That attitude is about to change, however, when Carver accidentally lassoes Molly Lassiter (Barbara Bedford). For the foreman, it is embarrassment and love at first sight. She is the sister of the boy he helped, Bart. They have come to the Strip with their older half-brother Noll Lassiter (J. Gordon Russell) to stake a claim, which causes Carver to say he's thinking about doing the same. Maybe they'll be neighbors.

Then, Molly introduces Carver to Noll. It is the same hombre he drenched in the trough earlier. That is a hiccup in the relationship, but it does not dissuade Carver from joining the land rush, hoping to be close to Molly. And as the day of the big event approaches, signs are posted warning everyone not to jump the gun or they will be prosecuted as "Sooners."

Kentucky manages to find Mrs. Riley in the long line of registrants for settling permits, and he holds her baby for her while she signs in. Elsewhere, Carver tells Bart all about the Box K, which he hopes to claim for himself. And Noll tries to persuade Molly to let Freel come courting, but she has no interest in the man, and she goes to meet Carver in the hotel's Ladies Parlor, where she receives a bouquet of prairie flowers to the cowboy along with an invitation to join him for the town's street celebration the next evening.

When Noll overhears Carver tell Hinman he's going out to the Strip one last time to look for Box K strays, the conniver gets Freel to report the cowman to Cavalry Major White (Taylor N. Duncan) as a Sooner. The local Cherokees inform Carver that the "white soldiers" are coming after him. If he wants, the warriors will help the cowboy fight them, but Carver says he will go peaceably if they arrest him.

By 8:30pm the next evening, the celebration is in full swing. Kentucky has got himself all dressed up to take Mrs. Riley out for the festivities. However, poor Molly has had no word from her date and is waiting on pins and needles when Freel approaches her to be his companion for the evening. She declines the offer and says she will wait for Carver. That's when Noll informs her that her date is not coming. He has been arrested as a Sooner.

Just then, Major White brings Carver into town as a prisoner and the celebrants suddenly turn into a lynch mob. The soldiers manage to keep the angry crowd at bay and get the suspect to their encampment. Boss Hinson informs White that the cowboy was only acting on his orders to bring in strays, but because Carver had registered for the land rush, he was prohibited from setting foot on the Strip prior to the official opening. His horse and weapons are confiscated and he'll have to sit out the big event in the cavalry stockade.

Before sunrise, Freel and Noll set out for the Box K to stake a claim ahead of the rush. A mounted soldier spots them and says they are under arrest, but their reaction is deadly—Freel shoots him, unaware that Kentucky has been following the two crooks ever since they left town. That is when Noll sees him and shoots the witness's horse. As the duo ride off, Kentucky packs the dead man on his cavalry horse, rides back to town and notifies Major White.

By now, it is just an hour before noon, when a cannon will be fired to signal the start of the land rush. Kentucky goes to the stockade to tell Carver what's happened. The prisoner says to gather up his outfit and meet him at the live oak. If he is not there when the cannon fires, Kentucky should go stake his claim alone.

At twenty minutes to twelve, Molly is still waiting at the hotel for brother Noll to pick her up for the rush. Carver tries to bribe a guard to let him out of the stockade, but it is no use. All along the east edge of the Strip, wagons, horses and even bicycles are lined up for miles to take settlers to their new homesteads. Kentucky waits patiently by the oak with his friend's horse and gear.

Feeling sorry for Molly getting left behind, the Hotel Proprietor (Fred Gamble) offers to lend her his horse and carriage. The bugle sounds "ready." White gives the signal "set." The cannon fires "go." And the stampede begins, with Kentucky off to the races along with everyone else except Carver, who is still in custody. But not to be left out, the foreman's startled, riderless horse returns to the stockade, where Carver grabs a long staff and uses it to pole-vault the wall.

Guards fire on the escaping prisoner but he is too fast. He dashes past wagons, many overturned when they lost wheels to the rough prairie surface. And Mrs. Riley's team runs out of control, heading for a ravine. Only quick action by Carver averts disaster. Even with that delay, the cowboy races past other riders, knowing exactly where he is going. He arrives first at the Box K, only two find two horses hitched outside the ranch hose—Freel's and Noll's.

There's a shoot out. Carver corners the two men, but Freel manages to escape when the cowboy fires wide of his mark with the next to last bullet in his revolvers. Freel gallops off to find Molly and tell her that Carver has jumped Noll's claim. Molly does not believe a word of it and insists on proof. They ride toward the Box K, where Carver has spared Noll and let him go free for the sake of his sister.

When Molly, Bart and Freel arrive at the ranch house, Carver has already placed his claim marker in the front yard. Molly sees it and accuses her former romantic interest of being a thief as well as a Sooner. She orders Carver out of her sight. Freel adds his two cents, which gets him a blistering left uppercut in response.

Carver mounts his horse and rides off. Along the trail he sees a rattler and shoots it, in no mood to be nice to critters this day. Not far away, Kentucky has helped Mrs. Riley stake her claim to fertile land called "the bottoms." He says it is time to be drifting on, but replying that she and the kids will be lonesome, the widow snares his vest with her ringed finger and pulls him in for a smooch. His reaction, "Shucks — let's get married."

Seeing Carver ride by, Kentucky calls out to him the good news. But Carver is despondent and says, "Women ain't reliable — cows are." He adds that he is "headin' for South America where there's millions of 'em." Off he rides. That's when Mrs. Riley steps in and tells her husband-to-be to hop over to the Box K and "tell that gal she's a fool." Off Kentucky rides.

Land-hungry Noll and Freel are not done doing their bad deeds yet. They ride up on a defenseless elderly couple (George F. Marion and Gertrude Claire) and brazenly order them off their claim. Fortunately, the location is in Carver's path and he comes to the rescue, disarming both men, tying them up and escorting them back to Caldwell to face military justice for the death of the cavalryman. And being honest to a fault, Carver turns himself in for his alleged crime and escape.

The Major, of course, knows a good man when he sees one and sends Carver over to the Caldwell House Hotel, where Molly has just returned the borrowed horse and carriage. As he walks in the front door, he is greeted with the cry "DON!" Molly has forgiven him and we see them together, embracing and overlooking the vast tumbleweed-strewn prairie.

== Cast ==
- William S. Hart as Don Carver (credited as Wm. S. Hart)
- Barbara Bedford as Molly Lassiter
- Lucien Littlefield as Kentucky Rose
- J. Gordon Russell as Noll Lassiter
- Richard Neill as Bill Freel (credited as Richard R. Niell)
- Jack Murphy as Bart Lassiter
- James Gordon as Joe Hinman
- George F. Marion as Old Man (credited as George Marion)
- Gertrude Claire as Old Woman
- Lillian Leighton as Widow Riley
- Taylor N. Duncan as Cavalry Major (credited as Ted Duncan)
- Monte Collins as Hicks (uncredited)
- Al Hoxie as Cowboy (uncredited)
- Fred Gamble as Hotel Proprietor (uncredited)
- Charles Stevens as Indian (uncredited)

== Production ==
=== Writing ===
The script by prolific western screenwriter, Hal G. Evarts, is based on the historical Cherokee Strip land rush of 1893. The story dramatizes the government lands, that had been leased to cattlemen, that were to be opened for settlement by homesteaders in the late 19th century. All prospective homesteaders were required to register before the allotted start time. To give everyone a fair chance, a cannon shot was fired to signal the beginning of the land rush when registrants were allowed to enter the strip. Those who tried to get in beforehand were called "Sooners"; the nickname of Oklahoma is the Sooner State.

== Reception ==
=== Contemporary reviews ===
Reviews at the time of its release praised Tumbleweeds as good entertainment. The New York Times reviewed the film in 1925 and wrote that Hart's performance emphasized "righteousness, his mental dexterity and physical prowess" in the role of Carver. "Although much of Don Carver's accuracy in shooting and his turning up at the psychological moment is nothing but the camera's good work, ... Mr. Carver, impersonated by Mr. Hart, frequently won applause from the audience yesterday afternoon."

A 1926 review of Tumbleweeds in Photoplay Magazine says "Bill Hart returns to the screen in a story laid in the time when the Indian territory was turned over to the homesteaders. The scene in which the prospective land owners, waiting for the cannon's boom which would send them racing in to stake their claims, furnished a brand new thrill...It is good entertainment."

=== Modern reception ===
Modern reviews of Tumbleweeds have lauded it as the high point of Hart's career and as a seminal film of the silent era that was unique for its era in its depiction of Indians and black Americans. Gary Johnson in Images Journal said that although Tumbleweeds was only a mild box-office success, it is arguably Hart's finest film. "The movie's most impressive sequence remains the land rush", wrote Johnson. "All manners of vehicles -- covered wagons, surreys, stagecoaches, even a large-wheeled bicycle -- bounce over the prairie in the mad rush to claim land. Other films would attempt to recreate the Oklahoma land rush -- such as Cimarron, which won the Best Picture Academy Award in 1931 -- but Tumbleweeds remains the best example."

John Nesbitt wrote that Hart went out on a high note with Tumbleweeds. "Tumbleweeds stands up remarkably well, and most film devotees will find it among the more interesting and entertaining melodramas of the silent era", wrote Nesbitt. Tammy Stone wrote that Hart was to Westerns what Chaplin was to comedy and that Hart managed to "both stay in the game and go out with a bang" in his last film Tumbleweeds. Hart's "last film is widely considered to be his masterpiece, and also one of the seminal films of the silent era", she added. Michael W. Phillips Jr. wrote in 2007 that the movie was unique in movies of the era because it included Native Americans who weren't faceless villains but Hart's friends and included African Americans among the boomers of 1889. Today, the film holds a 100% approval rating on Rotten Tomatoes.

== Hart's last movie ==
Tumbleweeds was Hart's last movie. In 1939, Astor Pictures re-released the film and provided an eight-minute introduction that would be Hart's last appearance on film. In this introduction, he states:

My friends, I loved the art of making motion pictures. It is as the breath of life to me ... the rush of the wind that cuts your face, the pounding hooves of the pursuing posse, and then the clouds of dust! Through the cloud of dust comes the faint voice of the director, "Now, Bill, OK! Glad you made it! Great stuff, Bill, great stuff! And, say, Bill! Give old Fritz a pat on the nose for me, will ya?" The saddle is empty, the boys up ahead are calling, they're waiting for you and me to help drive this last great round-up into eternity."

Hart retired to his ranch in Newhall, California and although producers continued to offer him roles in sound films, he refused to return to the screen.

== Revival ==
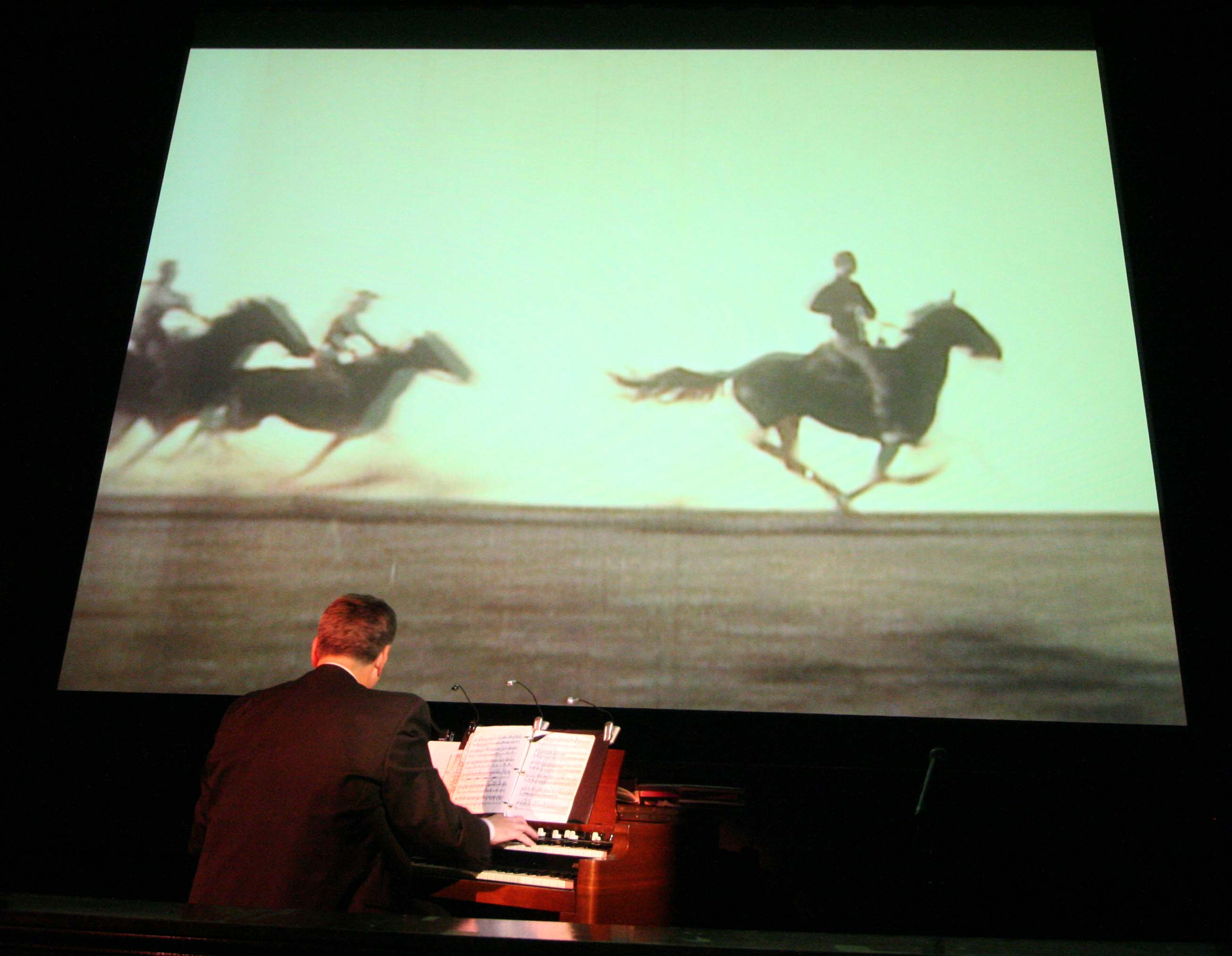
Silent Film organist Dennis James at a Ponca Theatre screening of the film.

On September 14, 2007, Dennis James, a silent film musician, performed a score to Tumbleweeds in a live performance at the Poncan Theatre in Ponca City, Oklahoma as a special commission as part of a celebration of the one-hundredth anniversary of Oklahoma statehood.

== Home media ==
In 2002, Image Entertainment released the Astor Pictures' 1939 version of Tumbleweeds on Region 0 DVD. This version, transferred from a print in the Paul Killiam collection, is regarded as the best looking video transfer currently available.
