= Hal G. Evarts =

American novelist

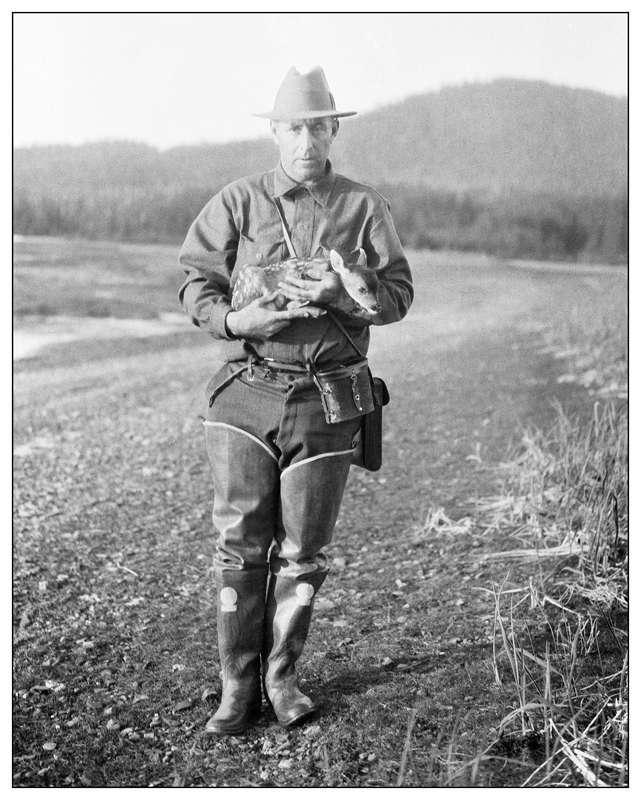
- Born: Harry George Evarts; August 24, 1887; Topeka, Kansas, U.S.
- Died: October 18, 1934 (47 years old); In the South Atlantic off the coast of Brazil
- Occupations: Naturalist and bestselling Western fiction writer
- Spouse: Sylvia Abraham
- Children: Hal G. Evarts, Jr.
- Parent(s): George and Emma Evarts

Hal G. Evarts (August 24, 1887 - October 18, 1934) was an American short story writer and novelist. Born in Kansas, he explored the West extensively soaking up everything about the natural world. Hal eventually wrote about his experiences and knowledge in his best-selling Western novels and magazine short stories. Several of his books were adapted to film.

== Early life ==
Named Harry at birth, he was quickly nicknamed Hal. His father, George, died of typhoid fever when he was 12 days old. His mother, Emma, and sister, Nellie, were left to raise the restless boy.

From an early age, Hal was much more interested in exploring the thick forests and creeks around Topeka than spending time in the classroom. He spent much of his free time studying the ways of the varied wildlife and their environment. He dropped out of school in the 9th grade.

Hal was a teenager when his mother married a wealthy man from Hutchinson, Kansas. Emma and her new husband departed on a 3-year-long trip around the world, leaving Hal in Hutchinson with his strait-laced aunt and uncle. Hal's guns, animal traps, duck decoys, and life style appalled his no-nonsense aunt and uncle. So, at age 16, he left town and headed south to Oklahoma.

== "Gypsy around the country" ==
For months, Hal and a friend camped along the Arkansas River hunting ducks and trapping muskrats, raccoons, and mink. In early 1904, he spent seven months on a Santa Fe railroad survey crew in Indian Territory of Oklahoma. That summer Hal took off with another friend to follow the harvest north to the Dakotas, working 18 hour days on threshing and haying crews until winter set in and he returned to the Arkansas River to hunt and trap.

During the next three years, Hal said he was a "gypsy around the country" traveling on foot, sometimes with team and wagon, but always with "gun, blanket, a pot and frying pan, a little bacon, salt and flour and baking soda, with a fishline wound round my hat." He explored much of the West during this time, learning the ways of wild creatures and the ways of nature.

Hal gravitated to the Colorado Rockies, Near the Absaroka Range and Yellowstone National Park, Hal befriended two local ranchers who were beginning a business to take tourists into Yellowstone. Fred Richards and Ned Frost incorporated Hal into their burgeoning guide business.

== Marriage, family, and a skunk ranch ==
As he approached his 20th birthday, Hal settled for a time into what he called a "normal business career." Back with his family in Kansas, Hal did basic office and maintenance work at the Hutchinson Daily Gazette. After six months, he was lured back to the Rockies to strike it rich in the Montana and Idaho real estate boom. But the bubble burst shortly after he arrived and he returned to Kansas. His mother's new husband, Leander Bigger, gave him a job maintaining a large estate he owned on the flanks of Pike's Peak in Colorado. It was there in the summer of 1909 that Hal met and fell in love with Sylvia Abraham. Hal opened a shoe store in Hutchinson and after three years of courtship, Hal and Sylvia were married on New Year's Eve of 1912.

A little over a year later, Hal took Sylvia on a "honeymoon" trip to Cody, Wyoming. The trip rekindled Hal's love of the mountains and when they returned to Hutchinson he sold the store and retired from city life at age 26. Hal went back to Wyoming, leaving Sylvia behind, and bought 120 acres outside of Cody. It was sagebrush and meadowland land with a creek running through it. The ramshackle small house had no electricity, no plumbing, and was in dire need of repair. Hal thought it was the perfect place to raise animals for their fur, then a valued commodity used in women's clothing. He ordered 250 6-month old surgically-sanitized star skunks and 250 red and silver fox pups from a breeder in the East. After patching up the house and building pens for his animals, he went to back to Hutchinson in early 1915 for the birth of his son, officially named Hal, then packed his family up for the trip to their new home in Wapiti.

It was a primitive life for the new mother and baby. Sylvia had to haul water in buckets from the creek in order to boil huge pots of cornmeal mush laced with elk liver on the wood stove. Hal had to feed his growing stock of skunks and foxes. The family stayed until the severe winter of 1916-1917 when Sylvia was convinced to escape to the warm climate in Los Angeles with their son. Hal stayed on alone to keep the skunks and foxes alive. Stricken with boredom during the harsh winter, he read and re-read western short-stories and history in magazines a friend had left in the cabin. He decided he might be able to tell a better story himself.

== Storytelling skills lead to a writing life ==
Hal passed the time by writing about his adventures in the wild onto any scraps of paper he could find, then discarded them in stacks around the room. He had little thought about doing anything with them but enjoyed creating them. Shortly after the Spring thaw began in 1917, Hal's sister's husband, Ted Fox, visited Wapiti during his travels as an insurance salesman. A storyteller himself, Ted was fascinated when Hal told him he'd been scribbling stories based on his experiences. Ted wanted to read them and thought Nellie would be interested as well, so he gathered the stacks up and took them away when he left for home in New Jersey. Nellie was an aspiring poet and thought some of Hal's stories had the potential to be published. Unbeknownst to him, she sent some selected stories to an agent whose advertisement she'd seen in the newspaper.

Hal had signed up for the Army but the war ended and he was discharged in New York after a short period of training. About that time, he received word that the person he hired back in Wyoming to kill, skin, and preserve the pelts of all his skunks and foxes did not properly secured their storage. Rodents got in and the furs were ruined. Three years of effort and investment with nothing to show for it. Now he was without any source of income.

Less than two weeks after learning of the disaster that befell his venture in Wyoming and wondering how he was going to support his wife and son, a letter from the literary agent arrived saying that two of his stories had sold to magazines for a total of $150, less the 10% commission and $7 reading fee of course. Inspired, Hal dashed off another story entitled "What Next" and sent it to the agent who sold it to Country Gentleman, a magazine in the Curtis Publishing Company family. Headed by George Lorimer, Curtis was the premier magazine publisher at the time with other well-known periodicals, or "Big Slicks," such as the Saturday Evening Post.

"...the mass circulation magazines were the television screens of...the first half of [the 1900s]. The 'big slicks' were then the central fixture of American culture...virtually created it, perpetuated it and expanded its influence." - W.H. Hutchinson

It opened the flood gates for Hal as the Saturday Evening Post published a short story called "The Big Bull of Shoshone" in the November 1, 1919, then "The Bald Face" in the November 15, 1919, issue, followed by "The Cross Pull" serialized in the next four weekly issues starting November 22, 1919. Hal had quickly joined the likes of Joseph Conrad, O. Henry, Rudyard Kipling, Ring Lardner, Jack London, F. Scott Fitzgerald, John Steinbeck, Edith Wharton, and Owen Wister whose stories were read in the Post by millions each week.

At that time it was common for authors to contract with a book publisher expanding the serialized version in the Big Slicks. Hal’s first full-length book came out in 1921. All but one of his 15 novels were serialized in magazines prior to being published in book form.

== Wanderlust, Hollywood, and family ==
Hollywood was eager to adapt The Cross Pull into a film. The movie, retitled The Silent Call, was the first to feature a dog as the main character. Strongheart (the dog) became wildly popular with the public, starring later in other movies like Jack London's White Fang in 1925. As filming began, he and Sylvia headed to Canada's Northwest Territories and the Mackenzie River, a long trip that he detailed in a two-part story called "End of Steel" published in the Saturday Evening Post.

Over the years Hal was always on the go, sometimes alone and sometimes with Sylvia and young Hal. He frequently went hunting. He took a 3-month voyage with his son to many islands in the South Pacific via Honolulu and Australia. The family moved to the Florida Keys for several months but had to return to Los Angeles. Hal was entranced with the California desert, taking many trips to Death Valley and around the Mojave Desert. And he traveled north to Kodiak Island and other parts of Alaska.

Automobile travel was still in its infancy. But Hal was not deterred by rough travel and lack of amenities. The three of them found their way in a seven passenger Buick throughout the West to Vancouver, Canada, then back through the Cascades and Mount Rainier, Idaho, Lake Tahoe, to Las Vegas and back to Los Angeles with a minimum of breakdowns and misadventures.

All the while, these were escapes from the Hollywood life he had no interest in but had to tolerate. Hollywood was paying many of the bills. In 1930, Hal's book The Shaggy Legion was under film studio development with a $2 million budget, one of the largest since The Birth of a Nation in 1915. Raoul Walsh was the director. Renamed The Big Trail, it was the first starring role for a handsome young man named Marion Morrison. When the studio asked Walsh to suggest a new name for the actor, Walsh asked Hal for ideas. The name John Wayne emerged from that discussion.

== Legacy ==
Hal's writings had a significant influence on the public's view regarding many environmental and conservation issues of the times:

- In 1922, Stephen Mather and Horace Albright, directors at the fledgling National Park Service, were trying to promote public awareness of parks and supported the Post's George Lorimer's assigning Hal to write about them. Some two dozen articles appeared in 1923 and 1924 with Hal's observations, opinions, and recommendations regarding places such as Sequoia Park and Kings Canyon in California's High Sierra, Glacier in Montana, plus Zion and the Grand Canyon in the Southwest. Albright, who would remain a life-long friend, wrote Hal "...you have done a great thing for the American people and made things easier for us. We are all grateful to you and appreciate your fine public-spirited stand on our policies and principles."
- Many of Hal's articles advocated conservation programs that were controversial in the 1920s but have subsequently become standard practice in public land management. Those included measures regarding soil erosion control, controlled burning, controlled game harvesting, controls on timber cutting and mining, establishment of wilderness areas, and development of more tourist facilities within public lands. For example, a 1928 article argued that government regulation was necessary to prevent the fur trade from "committing suicide" since fur-bearing animals were being taken faster than they could regenerate their populations. In that article, Hal extended that argument to fishing, lumbering, and other industries that use formerly abundant natural resources.
- He recommended the expansion of Yellowstone into the Tetons and General Grant into King's Canyon by requiring the Forest Service to turn over some of its land, permanently closing it to private enterprise. Long after his death both expansions were achieved.
- Although not an eager public speaker, Hal actively crusaded against a government agency and Stockgrower's Association lobby who were promoting the use of poisons to control the wild "nuisance" animals such as coyotes and ground squirrels. He gave a keynote speech in Philadelphia to a group of conservation-minded people. He submitted a long, passionate piece to the Post laying out his first-hand observations of the many negative impacts of the use of poisons. Unfortunately Lorimer rejected the manuscript as too long and too controversial.
- His words were noted by government officials at the time. Secretary of Agriculture Henry Wallace asked him to serve on a committee formed to study problems with Kaibab deer in Arizona and the Isaac Walton League urged him to become a member of a conservation advisory board formed by President Calvin Coolidge.

== Death ==
In the fall of 1934, Hal boarded a passenger ship for a six-week cruise around South America. Off the coast of Brazil on October 18, Hal died of a massive heart attack and was buried at sea. Many public and personal tributes were received similar to the following:

"Hal G. Evarts ranks with Ambrose Bierce, Joaquin Miller, John Muir, and Henry David Thoreau. Those five contributed more to virile literature than any other group of men in the United States. Some day he'll take his rightful place among American writers. It will be a high one." - Jim Kjelgaard, author of Big Red "Evarts's writing career was a logical extension of his occupational pre-occupation with the out-of-doors West and the wildlife it held. His articles on wild animals and natural resources conservation entitle him to recognition as forerunner of today's concern with the natural environment." - Eugene Manlove Rhodes, author of Paso Por Aqui, considered by many as one of the finest westerns ever written.

== Novels and other publications ==
- The Cross Pull. New York: Alfred A. Knopf, 1920. (Serialized first in the Saturday Evening Post, 4 parts: November 22, 1919 – December 13, 1919. Illustrated by Frank B. Hoffman)
- The Bald Face. New York: Alfred A. Knopf, 1921. (Short story first published in the Saturday Evening Post: November 15, 1919)
- The Yellow Horde. Boston: Little, Brown, 1921. (Serialized first in The Redbook, 3 parts: August–October 1920. Illustrated by Charles Livingston Bull.)
- The Settling of the Sage. Boston: Little, Brown, 1922. (Serialized first in The Redbook, 5 parts: October 1921-February 1922. Illustrated by Douglas Duer.)
- Fur Sign. Boston: Little, Brown, 1922. (Short story first published in The Country Gentleman: December 17, 1921)
- The Passing of the Old West. Boston: Little, Brown, 1923.
- Tumbleweeds. Boston: Little, Brown, 1923. (Serialized first in the Saturday Evening Post, 4 parts: September 2, 1922 – September 23, 1922. Illustrated by W.H.D. Koerner.)
- Spanish Acres. Boston: Little, Brown, 1925. (Serialized first in the Saturday Evening Post, 5 parts: June 27, 1925 – July 25, 1925. Illustrated by J. Clinton Shepherd.)
- The Painted Stallion. Boston: Little, Brown, 1926. (Serialized first in the Saturday Evening Post, 3 parts: September 26, 1925 – October 10, 1925. Illustrated by W.H.D. Koerner.)
- The Moccasin Telegraph. Boston: Little, Brown, 1927. (Serialized first in the Saturday Evening Post, 5 parts:July 23, 1927 – August 20, 1927. Illustrated by Albin Henning.)
- Fur Brigade. Boston: Little, Brown, 1928. (Serialized first in the Saturday Evening Post, 6 parts: April 21, 1928 – May 26, 1928. Illustrated by W.H.D. Koerner.)
- Tomahawk Rights. Boston: Little, Brown, 1929. (Serialized first in the Saturday Evening Post, 4 parts: April 6, 1929 – April 27, 1929. Illustrated by W.H.D. Koerner.)
- The Shaggy Legion. Boston: Little, Brown, 1930. (Serialized first in the Saturday Evening Post, 6 parts: November 30, 1929 – January 4, 1930. Illustrated by W.H.D. Koerner.)
- Shortgrass. Boston: Little, Brown, 1932. (Serialized first in the Saturday Evening Post, 5 parts: May 21, 1932 – June 18, 1932. Illustrated by W.H.D. Koerner.)
- Wolf Dog. Garden City, NY: Doubleday, Doran, 1935. (Serialized first in the Saturday Evening Post, 6 parts: July 14, 1934 – August 18, 1934. Illustrated by W.H.D. Koerner.)

=== Special 4-book animal series ===
- Jerbo the Jumper; Kobi of the Sea; Phantom the White Mink; Swift the Kit Fox. Whitman Publishing Co., 1930. All illustrated by Don Nelson.

=== Magazine articles ===
From 1919 through 1935, in addition to those listed above, Hal had nearly 100 other stories or articles appear in magazines such as The Red Book, Collier's, Saturday Evening Post, Country Gentleman, and Outdoor Life.

== Film adaptations and screenplays ==
- The Silent Call, 1921. Based on The Cross Pull. Directed by Laurence Trimble. Starring Strongheart the Dog, John Bowers, and Kathryn McGuire.
- Tumbleweeds, 1925. Based on Tumbleweeds. Directed by King Baggot. Starring William S. Hart in his last movie.
- The Big Trail, 1930. Based on The Shaggy Legion. Directed by Raoul Walsh. Starring John Wayne in his first lead role, Marguerite Churchill, and El Brendel.
- The Santa Fe Trail, 1930. Based on Spanish Acres. Directed by Otto Brower. Starring Richard Arlen, Rosita Moreno, and Eugene Pallette.
- Born to Fight, 1932. Directed by Walter Mayo. Starring El Brendel, Janet Chandler, and Onslow Stevens.
