= Lessons in Love and Violence =

- Opera by George Benjamin
- Librettist: Martin Crimp
- Language: English
- Based on: life of King Edward II
- Premiere: 10 May 2018; Royal Opera House, London

Lessons in Love and Violence is an opera with music by George Benjamin and libretto by Martin Crimp. The opera, which is based on the life of King Edward II, was premiered at the Royal Opera House London on 10 May 2018, conducted by the composer and directed by Katie Mitchell. The opera was a co-production with Dutch National Opera, Hamburg State Opera, Opéra de Lyon, Lyric Opera of Chicago, Gran Teatre del Liceu, Barcelona, and Teatro Real, Madrid.

The opera covers the events set out in Christopher Marlowe's play Edward II, which combines the story of Edward and Gaveston (who was murdered in 1312), with the deposition of Edward II by Mortimer (1327) and the overthrow of Mortimer and Edward's queen Isabella of France by Edward III (1330).

The opera is in two parts, of four and three scenes respectively, and is performed without a break. King Edward is not referred to by name, only as 'the King'. Similarly his wife Queen Isabella is referred to simply as Isabel, and his son, later Edward III, is listed as 'Boy, later Young King'. Both Gaveston and Edward's nemesis Mortimer are named.

== Roles ==
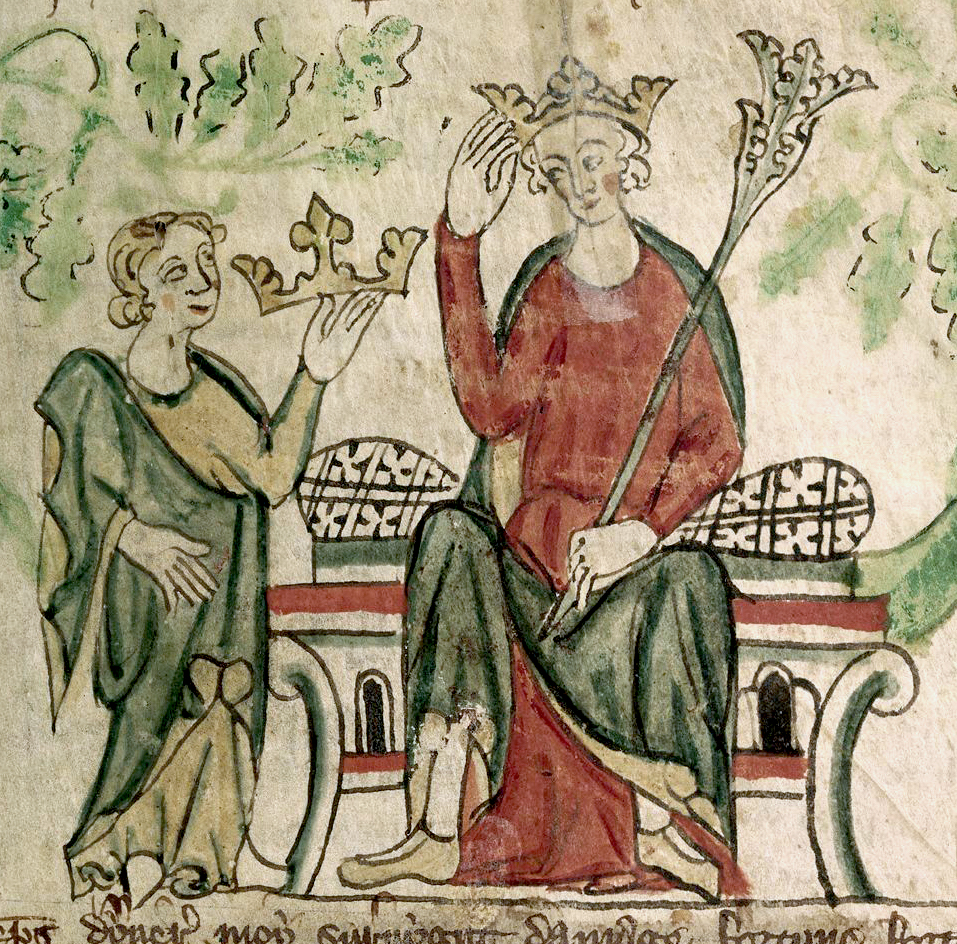
Edward II shown receiving the English crown in a contemporary illustration

Role	Voice type	Premiere cast, 10 May 2018 (Conductor: George Benjamin)
King	baritone	Stéphane Degout
Isabel	soprano	Barbara Hannigan
Gaveston / Stranger	baritone	Gyula Orendt
Mortimer	tenor	Peter Hoare
Boy / Young King	tenor	Samuel Boden
Girl	silent	Ocean Barrington-Cook
Witness 1 / Singer 1 / Woman 1	soprano	Jennifer France
Witness 2 / Singer 2 / Woman 2	mezzo-soprano	Krisztina Szabó
Witness 3 / Madman	bass-baritone	Andri Björn Róbertsson

== Synopsis ==
=== Part One ===
Scene 1. Mortimer criticizes the King's obsession with his lover, Gaveston, at a time when his people are suffering from war and starvation. The King strips Mortimer of his wealth and lands.

Scene 2. Mortimer impresses on Isabel the King's dereliction of his duties by confronting her with representatives of the suffering people. She agrees to support Mortimer's campaign against Gaveston.

Scene 3. Gaveston is arrested during an entertainment at the King's residence.

Scene 4. The King rejects Isabel when he hears of Gaveston's death.

=== Part Two ===
Scene 1. Isabel is now living with Mortimer. They instruct the King's son to assert his royalty by presenting him with a madman who believes that he himself is the true King.

Scene 2. The King is in prison. Mortimer persuades him to abdicate. Death, in the guise of Gaveston, claims the King.

Scene 3. The King's son, having succeeded to the throne, rejects Isabel and arranges the death of Mortimer.

== Critical reception ==
The opera received a positive reception in the British press, with some reservations. The review in The Guardian commented: "[D]espite the care that has so clearly gone into every aspect of the production, it often seems to be the orchestral music that is really in charge of the drama, as if the usual priorities of opera have been reversed. In the end the terrible story becomes the excuse for some striking music rather than being driven along by it." The critic in the Daily Telegraph commented that he "left Covent Garden impressed rather than excited or moved. For all the refinements, Benjamin and Crimp haven’t moved on from Written on Skin [their previous opera] so much as shuffled the cards to play the same game." The Stage however praised the opera: "George Benjamin’s new work on the subject of Edward II once again shows his operatic mastery."

== See also ==
- Edward II (play)
- David et Jonathas
- King Roger (opera)
- Lulu (opera)
- Les amitiés particulières
- Billy Budd (opera)
- Les amitiés particulières (film)
- Maurice (novel)
- Death in Venice (opera)
- La Cage aux Folles (play)
- Lilies (play)
- Edward II (film)
- Lilies (film)
- Brokeback Mountain (opera)
- Edward II (Scartazzini opera)
- Hadrian (opera)
