= Operetta for the Theatre Organ =

Operetta for Theatre Organ

Studio album by Leonard MacClain
- Released: 1957
- Recorded: Towers Theatre, Upper Darby Township, Pennsylvania
- Genre: Theatre organ
- Label: Epic
- Producer: Enos E. Schupp

Professional ratings
Review scores
| Source | Rating |
|---|---|
| The News and Courier (Charleston, SC) | (favorable) |

Operetta for Theatre Organ is an album released by Leonard MacClain in 1957 on Epic Records LP record LN 3372. On release, J. Albert Fracht reviewed the album as "full of good playing." The album features music from Victor Herbert's "Red Mill", "The Fortune Teller" and "Mlle Modiste." Also featured are songs from Sigmund Romberg's "The Desert Song" and "The New Moon". Rudolf Friml is represented by songs from "The Firefly", and "Rose Marie".

== Track listing ==
1. Every Day Is Ladies' Day with Me; Because You're You; In Old New York; Moonbeams (Victor Herbert)
2. Gypsy Love Song (Herbert)
3. Song of Love (Romberg)
4. Girls, Girls, Girls; Vilia; The Merry Widow Waltz (Franz Lehár)
5. Indian Love Call (Friml)
6. Thine Alone (Herbert)
7. The Desert Song; One Alone; The Riff Song (Romberg)
8. Kiss Me Again (Herbert)
9. Auf Wiedersehen (Romberg)
10. Your Land and My Land (Romberg)
11. Sympathy; Giannina Mia (Romberg)
12. Stouthearted Men; Wanting You (Romberg)
