= Cristal Baschet =

Musical instrument

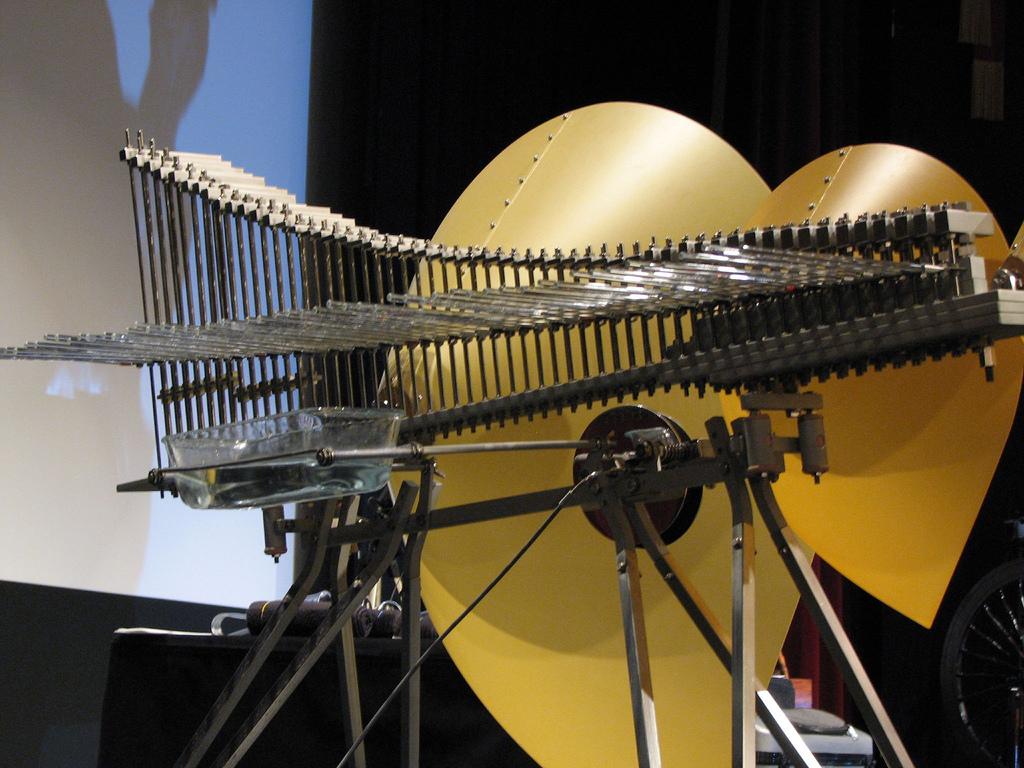
A Cristal Baschet

The Cristal Baschet is a musical instrument developed in 1952 by the brothers Bernard and François Baschet. Models of the crystal organs range from 3.5 to 6 octaves and are made of 56 chromatically tuned glass rods. To play it, musicians rub the rods with wet fingertips.

== Operation ==
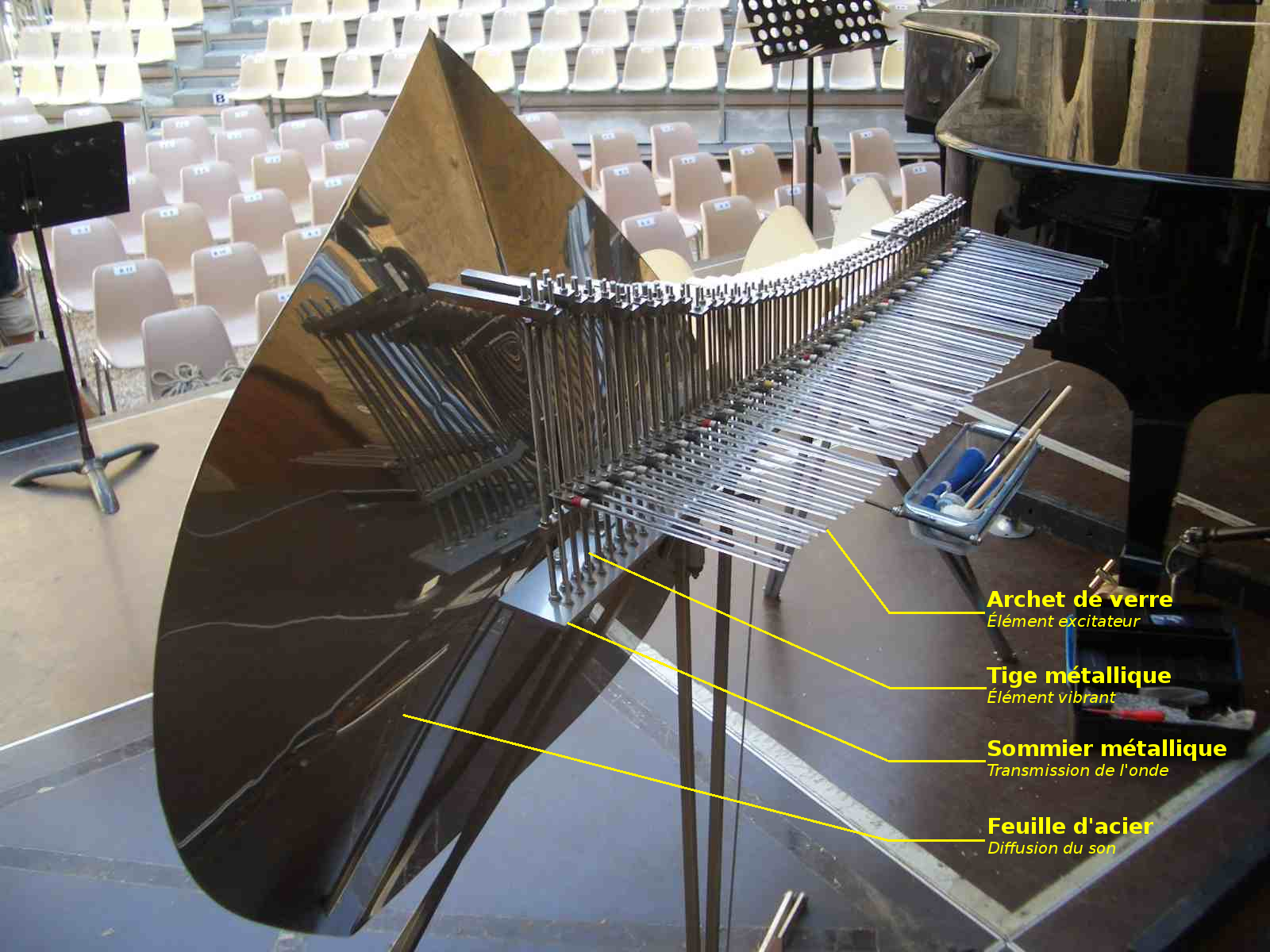
Components of the Cristal Baschet

Metal rods are embedded in a heavy plate to form the elements. Each metal rod is accompanied by an attached glass rod. The metal rod's length, weight and position at the equilibrium point determine the sound's pitch. The glass rod is gently stroked with a wet finger to produce sound.

The vibration of the rod with greater amplitude and weaker pressure is transmitted into the metal fitting. This causes a transformation in the vibrations and the shape of the wave produced. The vibrations propagating through the metal have a high pressure and a weak amplitude. This amplification in pressure is the result of fiberglass cones that are fixed in a wood frame alongside a tall, cut-out metal part in the shape of a flame. "Whiskers," placed on the side of the instrument, amplify high-pitched sounds.

The Cristal Baschet is also known as the Crystal Organ and the Crystal Baschet. The range of a concert instrument is five octaves. The Cristal is related to the glass harmonica.

== History ==
The Cristal Baschet was invented in 1952 by the French instrument makers and artists Bernard and François Baschet. They specialized in creating sculptures that could be played to produce music. They invented the inflatable guitar, an aluminum piano and an "educational instrumentarium" for the purpose of giving young people exposure to musical concepts.

== Repertoire ==
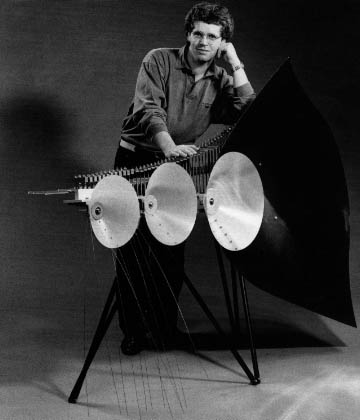
Thomas Bloch and the Cristal Baschet

Rob Scallon performing on a Cristal Baschet, 2022

It was originally used in the field of concrete music (avant-garde musical style introduced by Pierre Schaeffer and Pierre Henry) and gradually found its technique and repertoire, mainly thanks to the "crystallists" Jacques and Yvonne Lasry (1952) and then Michel Deneuve, who devoted himself to it in 1978, or Thomas Bloch and international touring glass music instrumentalist Dennis James.

A workshop of instrumental practice of the Cristal Baschet was opened in 1993 at the Conservatory of Albi with Cathy Tardieu, who still conducts it. A class of Cristal Baschet was also opened at the Conservatoire de Brive la Gaillarde in 2003 by Michel Deneuve. This class has been conducted since 2010 by Antoine Mas.

The Cristal Baschet has been used in various fields: dance performance, film music (including La Marche de l'empereur, Traffic, Solaris, Conclave, Project Hail Mary and Testament of Orpheus), theater, jazz, improvisation, tales (Bruno de La Salle), contemporary music, fado, song and rock. Artists that have incorporated the Cristal Baschet into their work include Manu Dibango, Fred Frith, Phil Minton, Lindsay Cooper, David Coulter, Vanessa Paradis, Arthur H and Bachibouzouk Band, Zazie, Jad Wio, Marie Laforêt, Zoe, Lokua Kanza, Carminho, and Daft Punk.

Among the composers are François Bayle, Michel Deneuve, Luc Ferrari, Guy Reibel, Jacques Lasry, Bernard Baschet, Etienne Rolin, Toru Takemitsu, Jean Michel Jarre, Secondson, Cliff Martinez, Beatriz Ferreyra, Michel Redolfi, Damon Albarn / Gorillaz, Tom Waits, Philippe Sarde, Jean-Michel Hasler, Jean-Michel Calvin, Horatiu Radulescu, Bruno Giner, Richard Hawley, Daniel Pemberton, Irmin Schmidt, Johan Söderqvist, Eric Fischer, Emmanuel Séjourné, Roger Steptoe, Alain Voirpy, Volker Bertelmann and others.

== See also ==
- Glass harmonica
- Ondes Martenot
- Musical saw
