= Leonard MacClain =

American organist (1899–1967)

Leonard MacClain (September 8, 1899 – September 1967) was an American keyboardist and composer who was prominent as an organist in the Philadelphia area. He gained international exposure through his recordings for Epic Records.

== Biography ==
Leonard MacClain was born in Philadelphia. His career as a theatre organist for silent movies started at the Jefferson Theatre when the regular organist there could not appear on account of inclement weather. In 1919 he began playing at the Fifty-Sixth Street Theater. He became the premiere theatre organist in the Philadelphia area for decades, earning the nickname "Melody Mac".

MacClain was also popular on radio, where he had his own show. In 1935 he debuted an instrument called the "Photona" on the CBS Radio network. The instrument was of two manuals, each manual including six octaves, and had foot controls for volume and tremolo.

By 1950 he was recording for Musicart Records. The late 1950s and early 1960s were the peak of MacClain's exposure, as he signed a recording contract with Epic Records, where he recorded the Wurlitzer organ in the Tower Theatre located in Upper Darby Township, Pennsylvania. During this time, he made numerous concert appearances, often in conjunction with the American Association of Theater Organ Enthusiasts. Highlights included being named convention organist for the Forty-Seventh Annual Rotary Convention in 1956, and as guest soloist with the Philadelphia Orchestra conducted by Eugene Ormandy playing "The Stars and Stripes Forever". He also frequently appeared during daily concerts on the Wanamaker Organ. During this time he lived in Ocean City, New Jersey, with his wife, Dorothy. In 1963, McClain traveled to Baltimore, Buffalo, Rochester and Philadelphia to record organs in four theatres scheduled for demolition and to California to record at the Lorin Whitney Studios in Glendale. These sessions were released on the Ralbar Records label. By 1966 health issues forced him to cancel appearances. He died in 1967 in Devault, Pennsylvania.

== Playing style and legacy ==
His playing was described as "forthright" and "sensible", yet he was also noted for his improvisational skills. He was said to be able to play any song he had heard from memory, making up the chords and accompaniment as he went along. On his radio show, he offered a prize to any listener who could stump him with a song, but was rarely bested. He was reviewed by Billboard as "outstanding".

MacClain was sought after as a teacher of his instrument. Students included Dennis James, who at the age of 16 was sent by MacClain to replace him in a Detroit concert when the organist suffered a heart attack, Dick Smith, Shirley Hannum Keiter, and Barbara Fesmire.

== Partial list of compositions ==
- "Days Without You Are Endless"
- "Smile Darn Ya Smile"
- "Where You Are Concerned"

== Selected discography ==
=== Albums ===
- Choice Christmas Carols (Valdoray VLD-101-L) 10" LP (1952)
- Theater Organ in Hi-Fi (Epic LN-3273) (1956)
- Joy to the World (Epic LN-3283) (1956)
- Operetta for the Theatre Organ (Epic LN-3372) (1957)
- More Theater Organ in Hi-Fi (Epic LN-3655) (1960)
- Theatre Organ After Dark (Epic LN-3697) (1960) (Re-released as Columbia Special Products EPSP-569)
- Leonard MacClain's Golden Years of Theatre Organ (1963) (Ralbar Records SDLP6300) 2 disc set
- Leonard MacClain Plays for Theatre Organ Lovers (Ralbar Records SOLP 6301)
- Leonard MacClain Plays Baltimore's Fabulous Stanton Theatre Organ (Ralbar Records SOLP 6302)
- 25th Anniversary Release in Memory of Leonard MacClain – recorded 1963 (1992) Vantage Records VCD-6303
