= The Santa Fe Trail (1930 film) =

1930 film

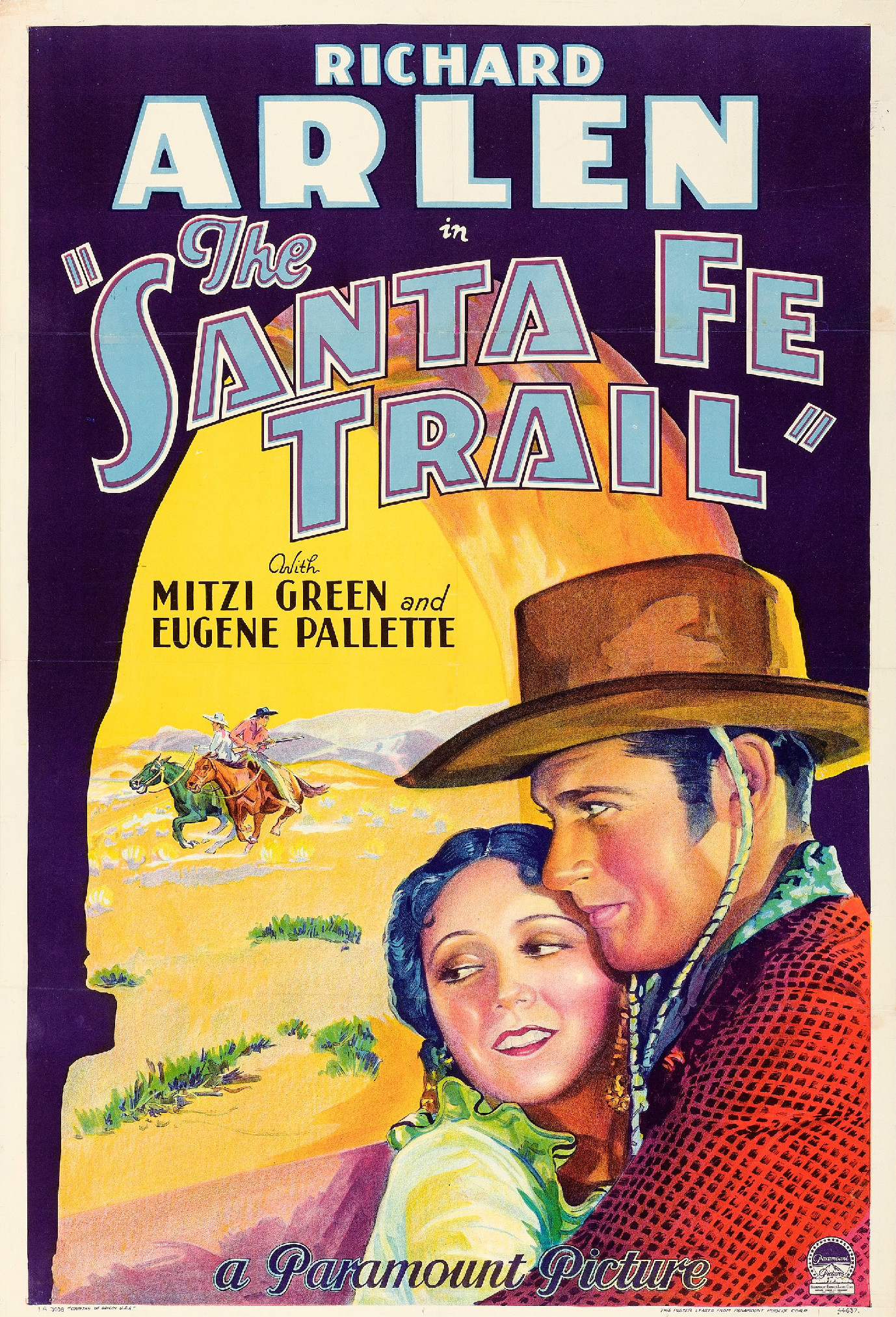
- Theatrical release poster
- Directed by: Otto Brower; Edwin H. Knopf
- Screenplay by: Sam Mintz; Edward E. Paramore Jr.
- Based on: Spanish Acres by: 1925 novel; Hal George Evarts
- Starring: Richard Arlen; Rosita Moreno; Eugene Pallette
- Edited by: Verna Willis
- Distributed by: Paramount Pictures
- Release date: September 27, 1930
- Running time: 65 minutes
- Country: United States
- Language: English

The Santa Fe Trail is a 1930 American pre-Code Western film, directed by Otto Brower and Edwin H. Knopf, released by Paramount Pictures, and starring Richard Arlen, Rosita Moreno, and Eugene Pallette. The film was an adaptation of Hal George Evarts's 1925 novel, Spanish Acres.

== Plot ==
A sheepherder has to clear his name after being erroneously accused of murdering an Indian. Two children who saw the killing come to his aid.

== Cast ==
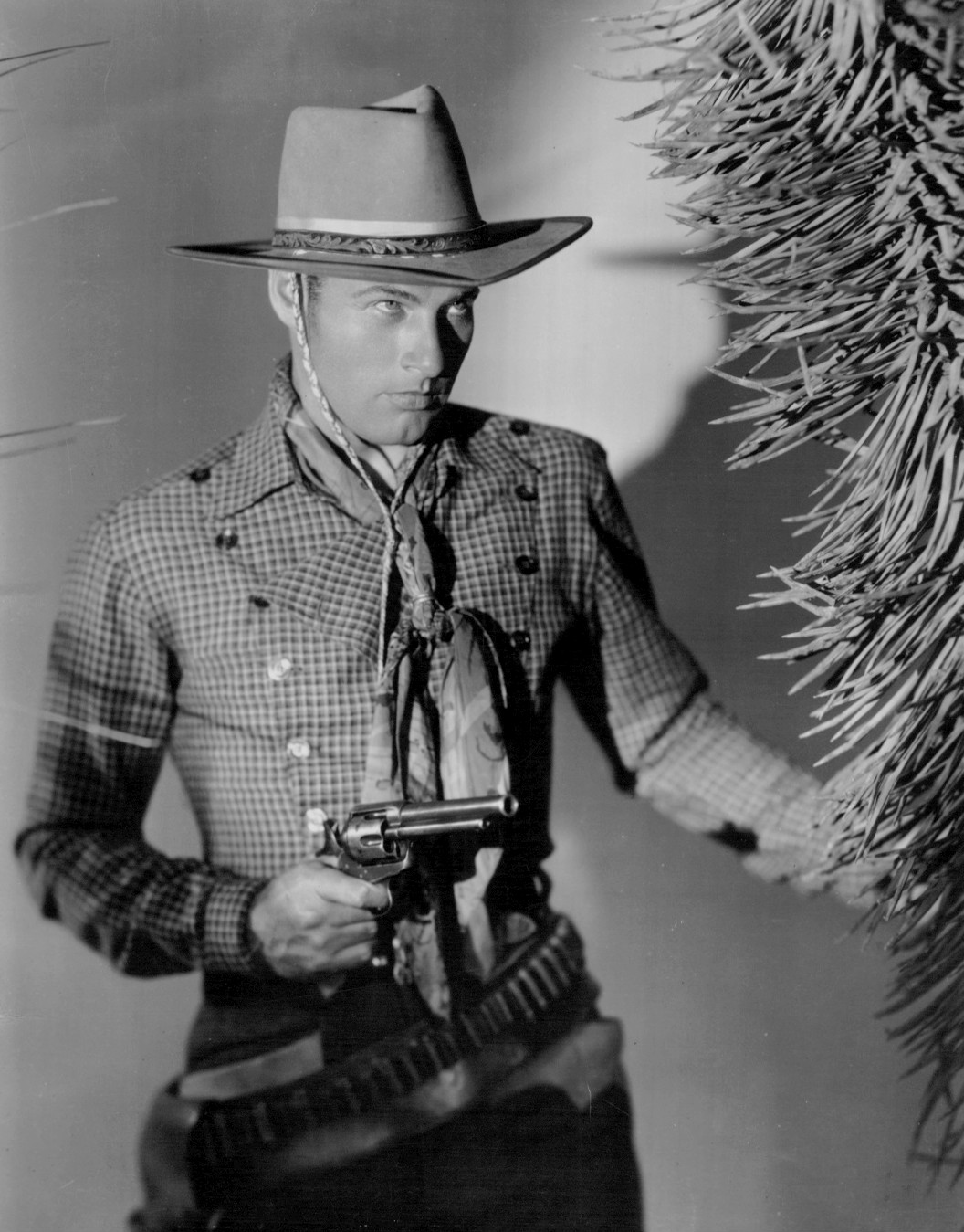
Richard Arlen in a scene from the film

- Richard Arlen as Stan Hollister
- Rosita Moreno as Maria Castinado
- Eugene Pallette as Doc Brady
- Mitzi Green as Emily
- Junior Durkin as Old Timer
- Hooper Atchley as Marc Coulard
- Luis Alberni as Juan Castinado
- Lee Shumway as Slaven
- Chief Standing Bear as Chief Sutanek
- Blue Cloud as Eagle Feather
- Chief Yowlachie as Brown Beaver
- Jack Byron as Webber

== Production ==
In addition to Brower and Knopf as directors, Sam Mintz and Edward E. Paramore Jr. were writers. David Abel was director of photography, Verna Willis was film editor, and Earl Hayman was recording engineer.
