= Jean-Michel Hasler =

French choral conductor, conductor, harpsichordist and musicologist

Jean-Michel Hasler (born in 1945) is a French choral conductor, conductor, harpsichordist and musicologist.

== Biography ==
A professor and founder of the Ensemble baroque de Limoges, Hasler followed the teaching of Ton Koopman for the harpsichord, Pierre Cao to conducting, Jacques Chailley in musicology and Émile Leipp in acoustics. Jean-Michel Hasler is also the founder and current conductor of the "Camerata vocale de Brive", a cultural structure with a high level amateur choir and the Chronochromie ensemble, composed of professionals.
