= Elizabeth Reiter =

American soprano

- Born: Chicago, Illinois, U.S.
- Education: Manhattan School of Music; Curtis Institute of Music
- Occupation: Operatic soprano
- Organization: Oper Frankfurt
- Website: www.elizabethreiter.com

Elizabeth Reiter is an American operatic soprano who has been based at the Oper Frankfurt since 2013, where she covered a broad repertoire from Armida in Handel's Rinaldo to the double role Renee/Alice in the German premiere of Olga Neuwirth's Lost Highway. She performed at international opera houses and festivals, such as singing Zerlina in Mozart's Don Giovanni in Tanglewood, conducted by James Levine.

== Career ==
Reiter was born in Chicago where she was a member in the Lyric Opera's children's choir. She sang as a child, for example in Puccini's Tosca and Boito's Mefistofele. As a teen, she appeared in Galileo Galilei and became a professional. She studied at the Manhattan School of Music and the Curtis Institute of Music where she performed several roles in the opera program. She took part in the Metropolitan Opera National Council Auditions.

Following two years in the Opern Studio, Reiter joined the ensemble of the Oper Frankfurt in the 2013/14 season, where she appeared in roles including Armida in Handel's Rinaldo, Mozart's Susanna in Le nozze di Figaro and Pamina in Die Zauberflöte, Gretel in Humperdinck's Hänsel und Gretel, Valencienne in Lehàr's Die lustige Witwe, Anne Trulove in Stravinsky's The Rake's Progress, and the title role in Janáček's Das schlaue Füchslein. In 2018, she appeared in the double role Renee/Alice in the German premiere of Olga Neuwirth's Lost Highway. In September 2021, she appeared as Melissa in Handel's Amadigi, conducted by Roland Böer, and alongside Brennan Hall in the title role, Kateryna Kasper and Beth Taylor. A reviewer noted her sharp coloraturas and dramatic outbursts, portraying the harsh character, and intense acting up to her death scene.

During Frankfurt Opera's 2022-23 season, Reiter made role debuts as Tatiana in Eugene Onegin and in the title role of Orff's Die Kluge, and returned to the roles of Asteria in Handel's Tamerlano and the Vixen in Janáček's The Cunning Little Vixen. Reviewing her debut in Die Kluge, a critic for Opera News described the performance as a strong role debut and considered her voice well suited to the title character.

In Frankfurt's 2025-2026 season, Reiter performed the role of Agnès in Benjamin and Crimp's Written on Skin, in a production directed by Tatjana Gürbaca and conducted by Erik Nielsen,

She appeared as a guest at Opera Memphis and the Opera Philadelphia among others. She performed as Zerlina in Mozart's Don Giovanni at the Tanglewood Music Center, conducted by James Levine, and as The Dragonfly in Ravel's L'enfant et les sortilèges at the Castleton Festival, conducted by Lorin Maazel.
