= Baschet Brothers =

Musical engineers

The Baschet Brothers were two French artists named François Baschet (born 30 March 1920, in Paris; died 11 February 2014) and Bernard Baschet (born 24 August 1917, Paris; died 17 July 2015) who collaborated on creating sound sculptures and inventing musical instruments, such as the Cristal Baschet. François Baschet was a sculptor and Bernard Baschet an engineer. The Baschet Brothers invented the inflatable guitar, the aluminum piano and many other experimental musical instruments. They created an "Baschet Educational Instrumentarium" for exposing young people to musical concepts.

The Baschet's research started in the 1950s artistic turmoil, soon turning the two brothers into the pioneers of sound sculpture, in addition to making them highly requested by musicians, composers, experimental directors.

In an attempt to create new sounds, Baschet brothers combined new materials, usually through folding metal sheets into geometric shapes. Their sculptures include both small folded sheet metal of a few centimeters and structures several meters high with loud and complex sounds. Their exhibitions were shown in museums throughout the world – the United States, Japan, Germany – as well as in small villages in France, aiming to make art accessible to all.

The work of the Baschet brothers of making sound art accessible to all continues through the official association, established in 1982: the Baschet Sound Structures Association (originally "Structures sonores et pédagogie", it changed its name in 2012). The association has the support of the Baschet family and has an exclusive licence for creating some of the Baschet reproductible works.

== Works ==
=== Instruments ===
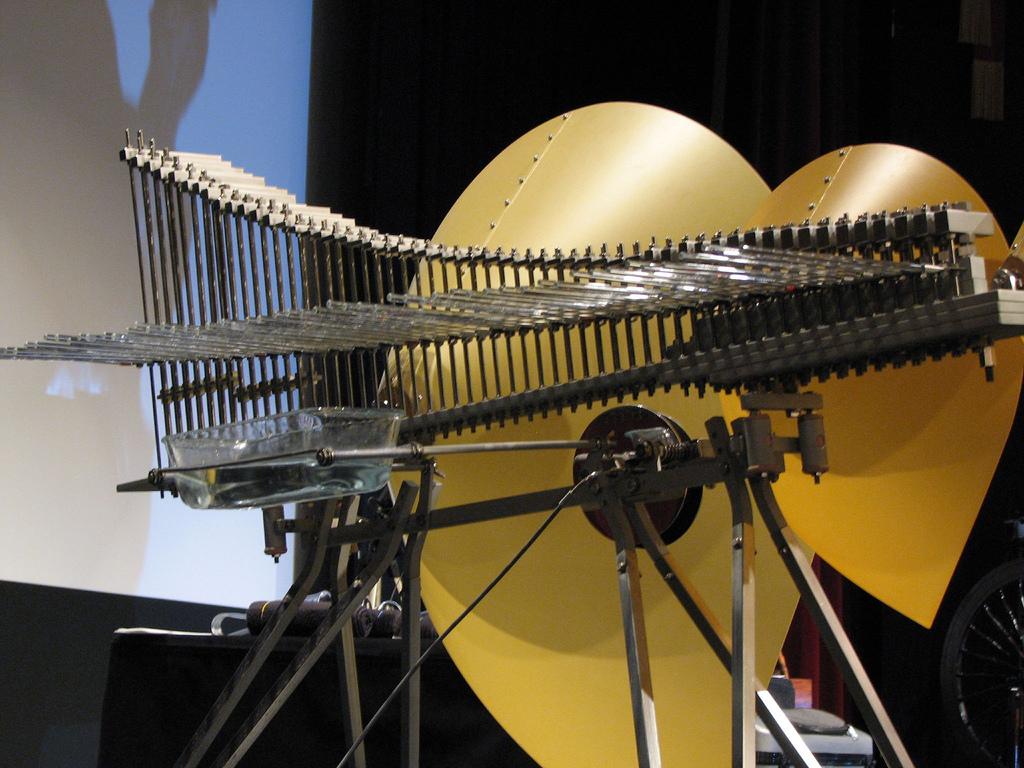
The Cristal Baschet

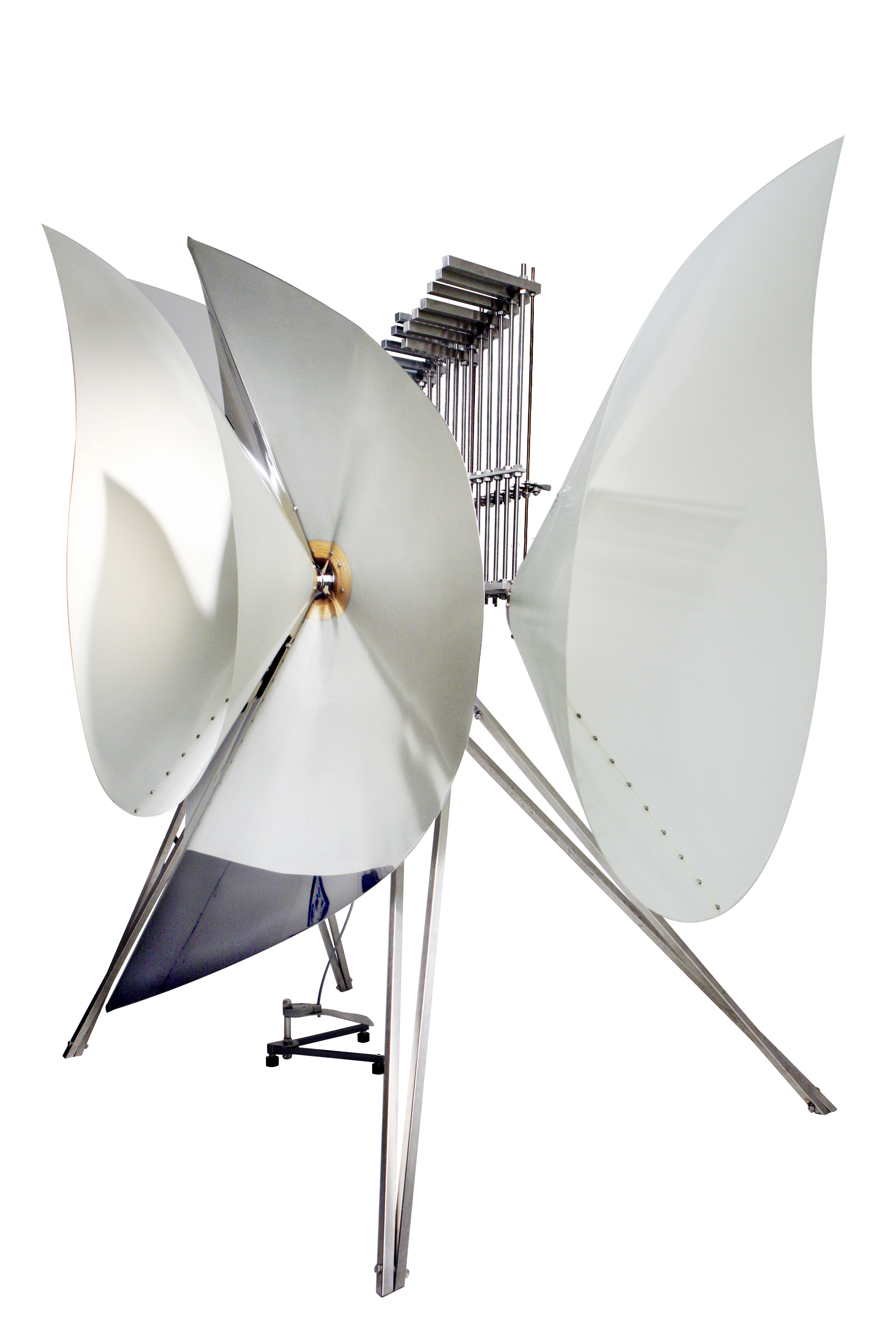
Baschet bass cristal

The Cristal baschet is a type of musical instrument designed by the Baschet brothers in the 1950s, the Cristal Baschet is played with wet fingers on glass rods. Its continuous, enchanting sounds have inspired many artists and composers. The current Cristal Baschet models produce a variety of sounds and can also be used in percussion. They can be fitted with numerous resonators including "moustaches" and different types of diffusers: cones and metal sheets.

The Rotating Whistler (“Le Sifflant Tournant”, created in 1962, produces the sharpest and longest sounds of all the Baschet Sound Structures. Turning the keyboard produces an unusual sound effect which does not need an amplifier cone.

Created in 1967, the Polytonal Percussion (“La Percussion Polytimbre”) includes large, straight rods that create deep, resonant sounds. The keyboard is organized with different percussive devices and cones diffuse the sound.

The Voice Leaf (“La Tôle à Voix”) was created in 1965 to mimic the Indian Tanpura, the metal sheets serve as resonators which transform the human voice when vibrated.

=== Public monuments ===
The Baschet brothers also created several public monuments such as clocks, fountains, bell towers and chimes – some ephemeral, some still in existence. One of the first fountains created was made for the World's Fair, in San Antonio Texas in 1968.

They made others in the early 1970s, including in Cologne, New York, Mexico City, London and Barcelona.

Subsequently, they worked on bell towers and clocks. The Baschet "signal sonore"(or school bell) of the Blaise Pascal school is in the process of being restored in Saint-Michel-sur-Orge – the town where Bernard Baschet's studio has been since 1970.

=== The Baschet Educational Instrumentarium ===
Invented in the 1980s, the Baschet Educational Instrumentarium consists of 14 sound structures which make a "sound palette" of around 100 different tones. Its purpose is to initiate children, adults and people with disabilities in collective musical discovery through games and experimentation, and without any previous musical knowledge.

Based on the large, original Baschet sound structures, the Baschet Educational Instrumentarium creates a broad spectrum of sounds, including those not in the classical European repertoire, as well as some which resemble electroacoustic sounds.

Education in sound culture is stimulated through listening to sounds, to oneself and to others. The experience of sound is not only through listening, it is also through hands-on learning and musical improvisation.

This Instrumentarium is also used in concert by musicians. There are approximately 500 Baschet Educational Instrumentariums in existence, in France and around the world.

== Career ==
François had wanted to be an artist, but his father warned him against pursuing the unstable life of an artist. He decided to study business in college, but felt no passion for it. After World War II, which had interrupted his education, he decided to travel around the world. He brought with him on his trip a guitar to help him earn a living, but wanting something more portable he invented an inflatable guitar using a balloon and a collapsible wood neck. He continued to perform with this guitar upon his return to Paris. Soon he and his brother, who had studied engineering, began collaborating on sculptural musical instruments.

Beginning in 1952, the Baschets started research into all existing musical instruments and put this knowledge to work in creating dozens of structures sonores (i.e., 'sonorous sculptures'). Their visually striking instruments were crafted out of steel and aluminum and amplified by large curved conical sheets of metal, and are most often easy to play and accessible to people with any level of experience. One example of this is the Hemisfair Musical Fountain, which consists of an array of posts at the top of which are groups of conical sound diffusers, and above them circles of metal prongs. These are played by jets of water aimed by observers.

In 1954, the brothers met Jacques and Yvonne Lasry. Jacques was a pianist and composer and Yvonne was an organist. The four formed an association which they called "Lasry-Baschet Sound Structures." They held their first concerts in 1955. The group was successful and in 1960 were asked by Jean Cocteau to provide music for his film, Le Testament d'Orphée. The group toured, appearing on television shows including The Ed Sullivan Show. In 1966 they were invited to hold an exhibition at the Museum of Modern Art and director Alfred Barr purchased a sculpture for the museum's collection. Their tune "Manège" was also used as theme for the Granada TV program Picture Box, which ran in the United Kingdom from 1966 to 1990.

In the 1960s the Lasrys emigrated to Israel. In 1977 Bernard met Michel Deneuve, a musician, who joined them, starting a new association, and assisted in creating instruments. Deneuve was especially dedicated to working on their instrument called the "Cristal".

== Discography ==
- "Crystal", Michel Deneuve, the double album for sixty years of the birth of the Crystal. 2014
- "Voyage autour du Cristal", Michel Deneuve, Rue Stendhal Distribution, new edition, 2013
- "Danse de Dunes", Michel Deneuve, Rue Stendhal Distribution, new edition, 2013
- Les Sculptures Sonores – The First Fifty Years, FMR Records, CD, 1999
- 4 Espaces Sonores, with Bernard Baschet, Michel Deneuve and Alain Dumont, 1982
- "Seize Nouvelles D'Ailleurs" (LP), Michel Deneuve, Sysmo Records, 1983
- "L'Art Du Cristal" (LP), Michel Deneuve, Arion, 1984
- Structures for Sound, Museum of Modern Art, 10" vinyl, 1965

== Bibliography ==
- Frauensohn, Danièle and Deneuve, Michel. Bernard Baschet : Chercheur et sculpteur de sons. France: L'Harmattan, 2007. ISBN 978-2-296-04171-4
- Mémoires sonores with preface by Yehudi Menuhin. France: L'Harmattan, 2007. ISBN 978-2-296-03383-2
