= Martin Crimp =

British playwright

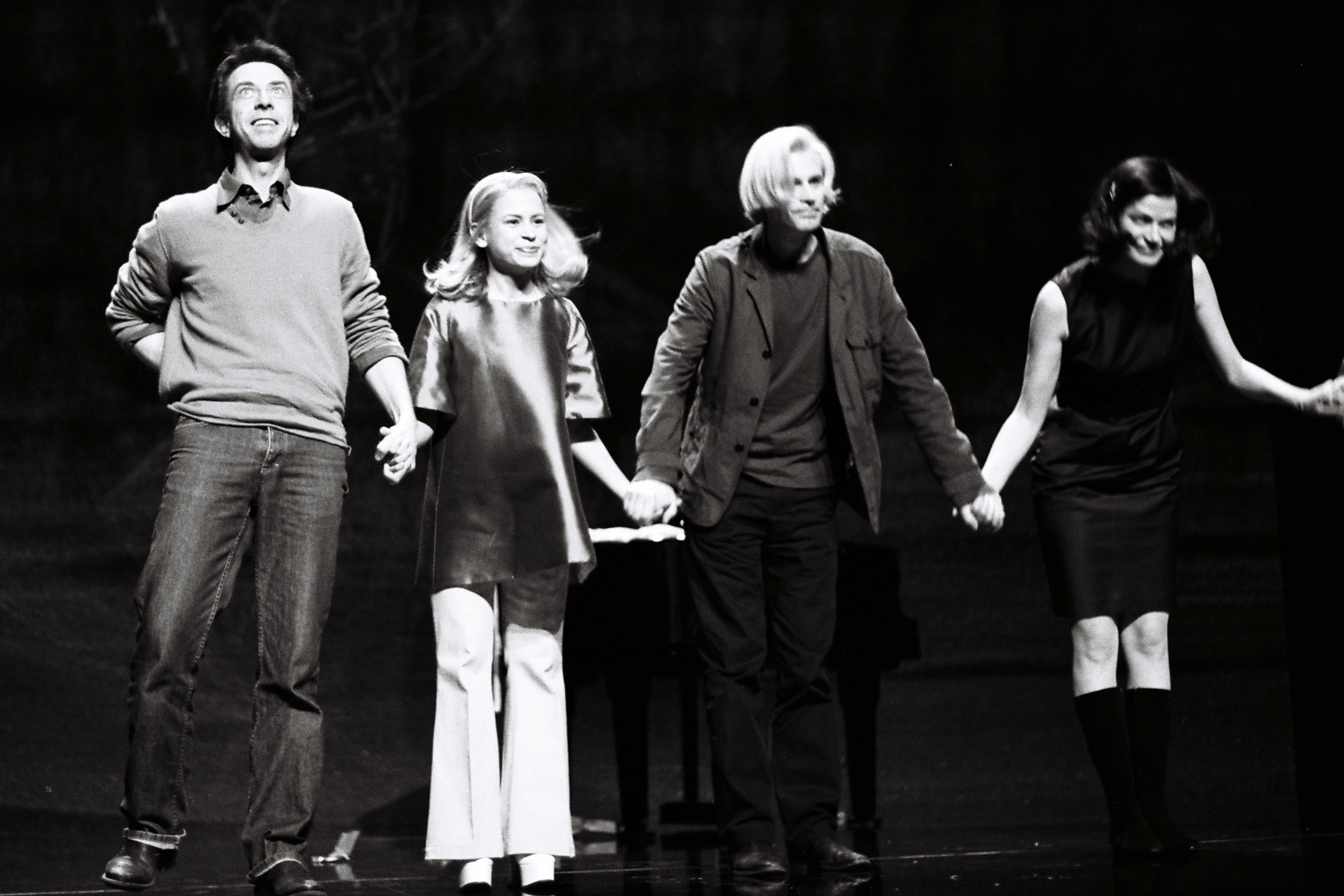
- Crimp (centre) at the Théâtre des Abbesses, Paris
- Born: Martin Andrew Crimp; 14 February 1956 (age 70); Dartford, Kent, England
- Occupation: Playwright

Martin Andrew Crimp (born 14 February 1956 in Dartford, Kent) is a British playwright.

== Early life and career ==
The son of John Crimp, a British Rail signalling engineer, and his wife Jennie, Crimp's family moved in 1960 to Streatham where he attended a local primary school before winning a scholarship to Dulwich College. But when his father was transferred to York, he went to the nearby Pocklington School, where he showed an aptitude for languages, music, English literature, and theatre. He read English at St Catharine's College, Cambridge (1975–78), where his first play Clang was staged by fellow student Roger Michell. Before establishing himself as a playwright, he put together An Anatomy, a collection of short stories, and also wrote a novel Still Early Days. These remain unpublished.

His first six plays were performed at the Orange Tree Theatre in Richmond. As he told Marsha Hanlon in an interview for the Orange Tree appeal brochure in 1991: "When the Orange Tree ran a workshop for local writers [in September 1981], I was invited to take part. The carrot was the chance of a lunchtime production, so I wrote Living Remains and the Orange Tree staged it – my first-ever produced play! I was so excited that I didn't think about the space where it was performed [then a room above a pub], but now I realise that the Orange Tree's intimacy and simplicity provided an extra layer of excitement."

Seven of his plays, and his second Ionesco translation have also been presented at the Royal Court Theatre, London, where he became writer-in-residence in 1997.

== Professional career ==
=== Playwright ===
Crimp’s play Attempts on Her Life, which premiered at London’s Royal Court Theatre in 1997, was described by critic Aleks Sierz as the "event that secured his reputation as the most innovative, most exciting, and most exportable playwright of his generation" [Sierz, Aleks, Aleks, (2013) p.48]. The play presents a unique structure, as none of the lines are assigned to specific characters, and Crimp does not specify the number of actors required to perform the piece. The play consists of seventeen seemingly unrelated scenes in which groups of people provide contradictory descriptions of an absent protagonist, a woman who is discussed as a terrorist, the daughter of grieving parents, an artist, and even a new car. Through its deliberate fragmentation, Attempts on Her Life challenges the audience to reconsider their understanding of what constitutes a "play" and raises questions about the existence of individuals beyond the constructs we create.

His other plays range from tragi-comic studies of suburban guilt and repression — Definitely the Bahamas (1987), Dealing with Clair (1989), The Country (2000) — via the satirical ‘entertainment’ In the Republic of Happiness (2012) — to powerful re-writings of Greek classics — Cruel & Tender (2004), The Rest Will Be Familiar to You from Cinema (2013). This unusual variety has led Vicky Angelaki to write:

Crimp’s multifaceted theatre, rich in textual, visual and visceral nuances, moves beyond rigid groupings of drama types and genres. What makes Crimp’s work both challenging and fascinating is its dual and equal focus on the private and the public, the collective and the individual, the humorous and the dramatic, the spoken and the unspoken. [Angelaki, Vicky (2012), The Plays of Martin Crimp, Palgrave Macmillan, page1]

Crimp's work has successfully received numerous productions abroad. In Germany, he is considered to be "one of the most respected British playwrights" and it was reported in 2013 that there has been "more than 60 German-language productions of his work in the past two decades."

In 2021, Crimp was recipient of Germany’s Nyssen-Bansemer theater prize in recognition of the importance of his body of work. [Süddeutsche Zeitung, 29 March 2021] Writing about the prize in Theater heute magazine, Till Briegleb praises the way that “With great authority, Crimp sketches the most diverse victims of a bourgeois society that wants to ignore all connections between their tranquil existence and the violence that makes it possible. From the murderer to the child, everyone who appears is unique, their life-lies and fears individual.”

Martin Crimp is sometimes described as a practitioner of the "in-yer-face" school of contemporary British drama, although he rejects the label.

In 2022, he performed his play Not one of these people, which gave voice to 299 different characters. Supported with a live deepfake video generator, imagined by Quebec director Christian Lapointe, the playwright accepted Lapointe’s invitation to perform as an actor on stage for the first time.

=== Theatre translator ===
From 1997 onwards, Crimp has had a parallel career as theatre translator, making his first impact at the Royal Court Theatre with a translation of Ionesco’s The Chairs, a production that subsequently transferred to Broadway. His re-writings of Molière’s The Misanthrope (1996, revived 2009) and Rostand’s Cyrano de Bergerac (2019/22) were both commercially and critically successful, the latter transferring from London’s West End to the Brooklyn Academy of Music. These rewritings have led some critics to see them as new plays. Angelaki, for example, argues that "Crimp’s radical adaptations … depart substantially from the early versions of the texts that inspire them and as such belong to a discussion of Crimp’s playwriting canon, rather than of his translations or versions" [Angelaki, Vicky, Op. Cit. page 154]

=== Opera librettist ===
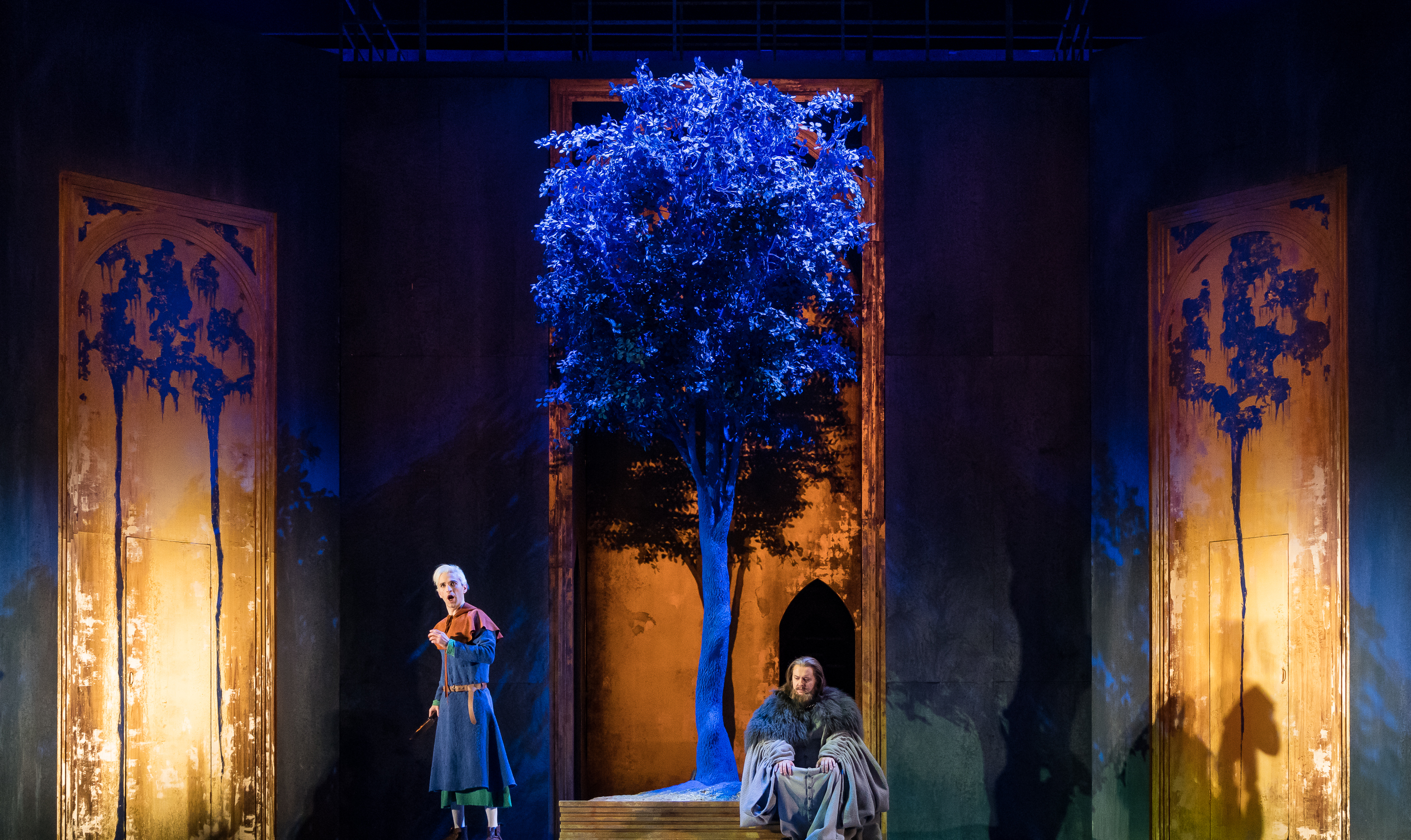
Scene from a 2018 performance of Written on Skin by Opera Philadelphia

In 2006, Crimp began a collaboration with composer George Benjamin that has led to the creation of four operas: Into the Little Hill (2006), Written on Skin (2012), Lessons in Love and Violence (2018), and Picture a Day Like This (2023). Written on Skin in particular has garnered international acclaim since its premiere at the Festival d’Aix en Provence in 2012.

== Works ==
=== Plays ===
- Not One Of These People (Carrefour international de théâtre Théâtre La Bordée 2022 )
- When We Have Sufficiently Tortured Each Other: 12 Variations on Samuel Richardson’s Pamela, ("provoked" by Richardson's Pamela, National Theatre, Dorfman, 2019)
- Men Asleep (Deutsches Schauspielhaus 2018)
- The Rest Will Be Familiar to You from Cinema (inspired by Euripides' Phoenician Women, Deutsches Schauspielhaus 2013)
- In the Republic of Happiness (Royal Court Theatre 2012)
- Play House (Orange Tree 2012, revived with Definitely the Bahamas and directed by the author)
- The City (Royal Court, Jerwood Theatre Downstairs 2008)
- Fewer Emergencies (Royal Court, Theatre Upstairs 2005)
- Cruel and Tender (Young Vic 2004)
- Advice to Iraqi women (Royal Court 2003)
- Face to the Wall (Royal Court 2002)
- The Country (Royal Court 2000, revived at the Tabard Theatre May 2008)
- Attempts on Her Life (Royal Court 1997; National Theatre, Lyttelton, March 2007)
- The Treatment (Royal Court 1993; revived Almeida Theatre 2017)
- Getting Attention (Royal Court, Theatre Upstairs 1991)
- No One Sees the Video (Royal Court, Theatre Upstairs 1990)
- Play with Repeats (Orange Tree 1989)
- Dealing with Clair (Orange Tree 1988)
- Definitely the Bahamas, "a group of three plays for consecutive performance" also including A Kind of Arden and The Spanish Girls (Orange Tree 1987)
- A Variety of Death-Defying Acts (Orange Tree 1985)
- Four Attempted Acts (Orange Tree 1984)
- Living Remains (Orange Tree lunchtime, 9–25 July 1982)

=== Translations ===
- Cyrano De Bergerac (Rostand) (Playhouse Theatre 2019, Harold Pinter Theatre 2022)
- Big and Small (Gross und klein by Botho Strauß), a 2011 Sydney Theatre Company production, co-commissioned by the Barbican Centre, London 2012 Festival, Théâtre de la Ville, Paris, Vienna Festival and Ruhrfestspiele Recklinghausen; Cate Blanchett as Lotte.
- Pains of Youth (Krankheit der Jugend by Ferdinand Bruckner) (National Theatre 2009)
- Rhinoceros (Ionesco) (Royal Court 2007)
- The Seagull (Chekhov) (National Theatre 2006)
- The False Servant (Marivaux) (National Theatre 2004)
- The Triumph of Love (Marivaux) (Almeida 1999)
- The Maids (Genet) (Young Vic 1999)
- Roberto Zucco (Bernard-Marie Koltès) (RSC The Other Place, Stratford 1997)
- The Chairs (Ionesco) (Theatre Royal Bath 1997)
- The Misanthrope (Molière) (Young Vic 1996, revived Comedy Theatre 2009)
- Love Games (Jerzy Przezdziecki) (co-written with Howard Curtis, Orange Tree Theatre lunchtime, 9 April – 1 May 1982)

=== Opera libretti ===
- Picture a Day Like This (2023, composer George Benjamin)
- Lessons in Love and Violence (2018, composer George Benjamin)
- Written on Skin (2012, composer George Benjamin)
- Into the Little Hill (2006, composer George Benjamin)
