= George Benjamin (composer) =

English composer (born 1960)

Sir George Benjamin CBE
- Born: 31 January 1960 (age 66); London, UK
- Occupations: Composer; Conductor; Pianist; Academic teacher
- Awards: Golden Lion Award; Arnold Schönberg Prize; Ernst von Siemens Music Prize

Sir George William John Benjamin, CBE (born 31 January 1960) is an English composer, conductor, pianist and teacher.

== Biography ==
Benjamin was born in London and attended Westminster School. He studied piano privately with Marguerite Tury from 1967–1974. He wrote his first composition at the age of nine, and took piano and composition lessons with Peter Gellhorn until age 15, after which Gellhorn arranged for Benjamin to continue his lessons in Paris with Olivier Messiaen, whom he had known for many years. Messiaen was reported to have described Benjamin as his favourite pupil. He then read music at King's College, Cambridge, studying under Alexander Goehr and Robin Holloway.

Benjamin's orchestral piece Ringed by the Flat Horizon (written for the Cambridge University Musical Society and premiered in Cambridge under the baton of Mark Elder on 5 March 1980) was performed at The Proms that August, while he was still a student, making him the then-youngest living composer to have had music performed at the Proms. The London Sinfonietta and Sir Simon Rattle premiered At First Light two years later. Antara was commissioned by IRCAM for the 10th anniversary of the Pompidou Centre in 1987 and Three Inventions for chamber orchestra were written for the 75th Salzburg Festival in 1995. The London Symphony Orchestra under Pierre Boulez premiered Palimpsests in 2002 to mark the opening of 'By George', a season-long portrait which included the first performance of Shadowlines by Pierre-Laurent Aimard. More recent celebrations of Benjamin's work have taken place at Southbank Centre in 2012 (as part of the UK's Cultural Olympiad) and at the Barbican in 2016.

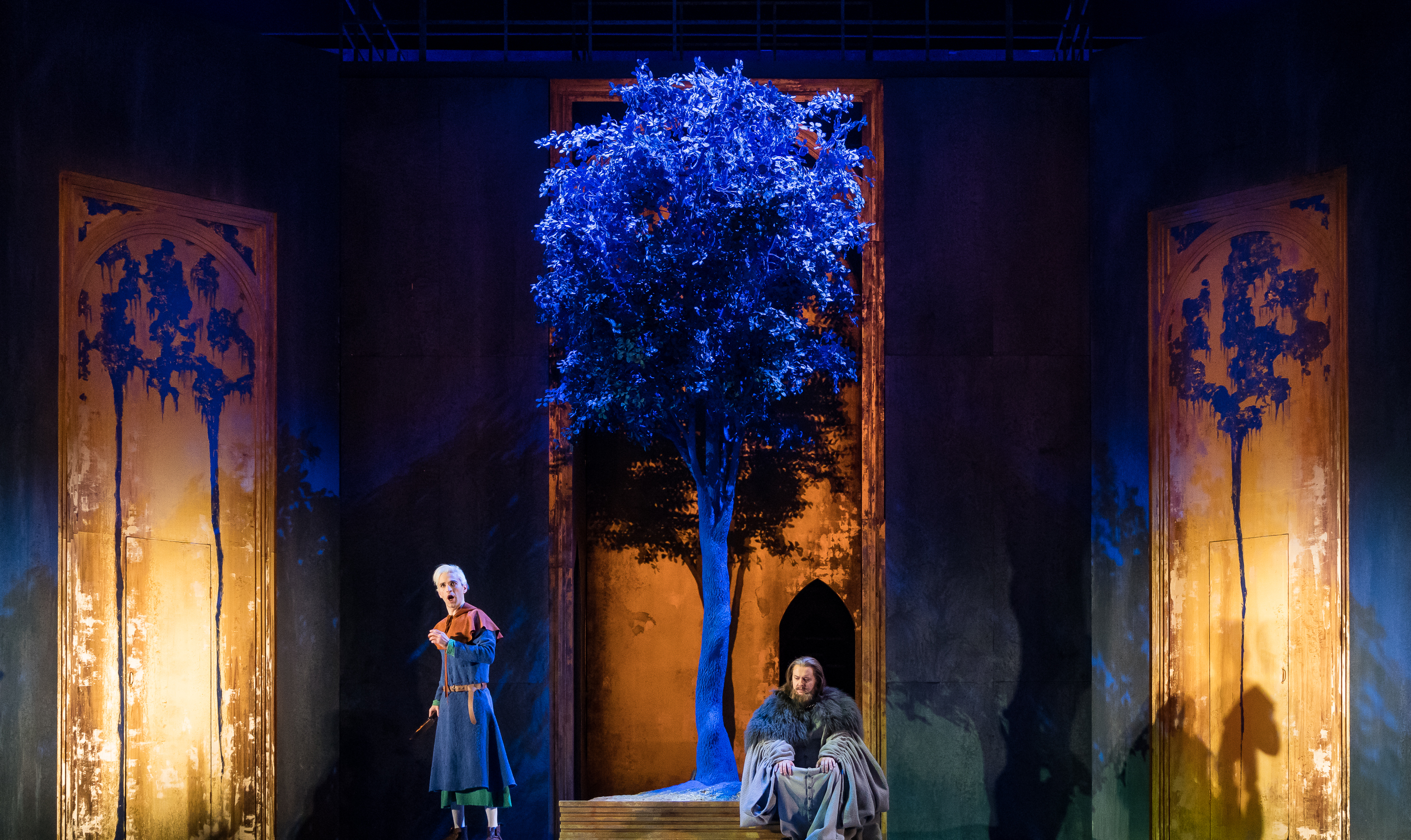
A scene from a 2018 performance of Benjamin's opera Written on Skin by Opera Philadelphia

Benjamin has composed four operas, all with librettos by Martin Crimp. Their first operatic work was Into the Little Hill, commissioned in 2006 by the Festival d'Automne in Paris. It received its London premiere at the Royal Opera House in February 2009. Their second collaboration, Written on Skin, premiered at the Aix-en-Provence Festival in July 2012. Benjamin conducted the UK premiere at the Royal Opera House, Covent Garden, in March 2013. Lessons in Love and Violence, their third collaboration over the period 2015–2017, premiered at the Royal Opera House in 2018. Their fourth opera collaboration, Picture a Day Like This, was commissioned by and first produced at the Aix Festival at the Théâtre du Jeu de Paume in 2023; Benjamin conducted with Marianne Crebassa as the woman.

As a conductor, Benjamin made his operatic debut in 1999 conducting Pelléas et Mélisande at La Monnaie, Brussels, and he has conducted numerous world premieres, including works by Wolfgang Rihm, Unsuk Chin, Gérard Grisey, and György Ligeti. In 1993, he curated the first Meltdown music festival in London and in 2010 he was the Music Director of the Ojai Music Festival in California. For the 2018–2019 season, Benjamin was composer-in-residence with the Berlin Philharmonic Orchestra. In January 2025, the London Philharmonic Orchestra announced the appointment of Benjamin as its next composer-in-residence, effective September 2025.

For sixteen years, Benjamin taught composition at the Royal College of Music, London, where he became the first Prince Consort Professor of Composition before succeeding Sir Harrison Birtwistle as Henry Purcell Professor of Composition at King's College London in January 2001. His pupils include Luke Bedford, Robin de Raaff, and Dai Fujikura.

== Honours ==
In 2019, Benjamin was awarded the Golden Lion Award for lifetime achievement from the Venice Biennale. Other awards include the 2001 Arnold Schönberg Prize, the 2015 Prince Pierre of Monaco composition prize (for his opera Written on Skin), and 2023 the Ernst von Siemens Music Prize. In 2022, Benjamin received the Ivor Novello Award for Outstanding Works Collection. For 2023, he received the BBVA Foundation Frontiers of Knowledge Award.

In 2019, critics at The Guardian ranked Written on Skin as the second best work of the 21st-century. In 2024, Picture a day like this received an Ivor Novello Award nomination for Best Stage Work Composition.

An honorary fellow of King's College Cambridge, the Guildhall School of Music and Drama, the Royal College of Music and the Royal Academy of Music, Benjamin is also an Honorary Member of the Royal Philharmonic Society. He is foreign member of the Royal Swedish Academy of Music. He was awarded a C.B.E. in 2010, made a Commandeur de l'Ordre des Arts et des Lettres in 2015, and was knighted in the 2017 Queen's Birthday Honours.

== Personal life ==
Benjamin lives in northwest London with his partner, the filmmaker Michael Waldman, whose credits include The Day John Lennon Died, The Scandalous Adventures of Lord Byron, and the TV miniseries Musicality.

== Works ==
=== Opera ===
- Into the Little Hill (2006): libretto by Martin Crimp
- Written on Skin (2009–2012): libretto by Martin Crimp
- Lessons in Love and Violence (2015–2017): libretto by Martin Crimp
- Picture a Day Like This (2023): libretto by Martin Crimp

=== Orchestral ===
- Ringed by the Flat Horizon for orchestra (1979–1980)
- A Mind of Winter for soprano and orchestra (1981, text: Wallace Stevens)
- Sudden Time for large orchestra (1989–1993)
- Three Inventions for chamber orchestra (1993–1995)
- Sometime Voices for baritone, chorus and orchestra (1996, text: William Shakespeare)
- Palimpsests for orchestra (2000–2002)
- Dance Figures, nine choreographic scenes for orchestra (2004)
- Duet for piano and orchestra (2008)
- Dream of the Song for countertenor, female chorus and orchestra (2014–2015, texts: Solomon Ibn Gabirol and Samuel HaNagid, trans. Peter Cole; Federico García Lorca)
- Concerto for Orchestra (2021)

=== Ensemble ===
- Octet for 8 players (1978)
- At First Light for 14 players (1982)
- Antara for 16 players and electronics (1987)
- Upon Silence for mezzo-soprano and viols/strings (1990, text: William Butler Yeats)
- Olicantus for 15 players (2002)

=== Chamber and instrumental ===
- Piano Sonata (1977–1978)
- Flight for solo flute (1979)
- Three Studies for piano (1982–1985)
- Viola, Viola for viola duo (1997)
- Shadowlines – six canonic preludes for piano (2001)
- Three Miniatures for solo violin (2001–2002)
- Piano Figures – ten short pieces for piano (2004)
