= Written on Skin =

2012 opera by George Benjamin

- Opera by George Benjamin
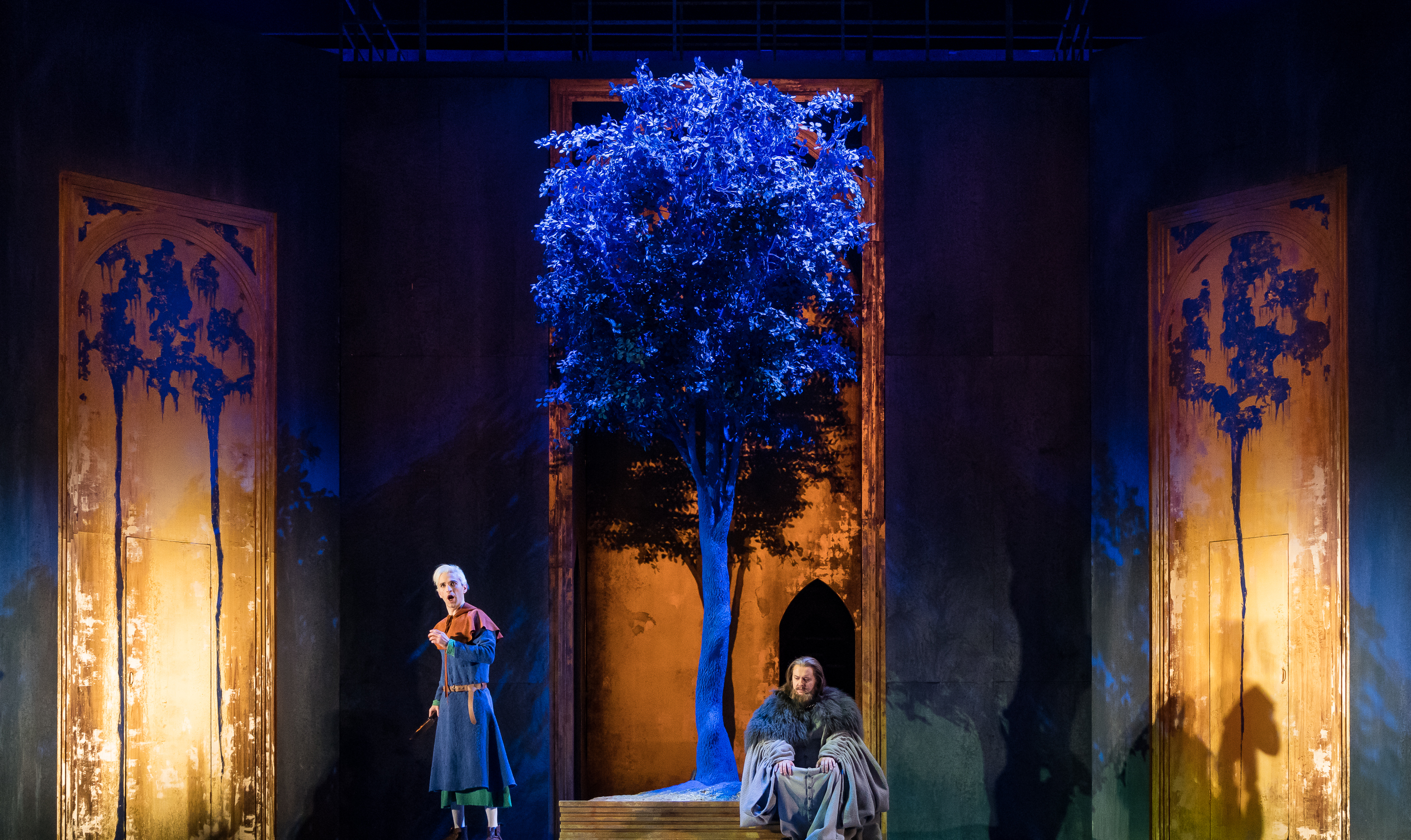
- Scene from a 2018 performance by Opera Philadelphia
- Librettist: Martin Crimp
- Language: English
- Based on: legend of Guillaume de Cabestanh
- Premiere: 7 July 2012; Aix-en-Provence Festival

Written on Skin is an opera by the British composer George Benjamin, with a libretto written by Martin Crimp.

Benjamin's first full-length opera, it was premiered at the 2012 Aix-en-Provence Festival by the Mahler Chamber Orchestra as a commission from five opera centres, and received its British premiere at the Royal Opera House in London in March 2013 and its Paris premiere at the Opéra-Comique in November that year; Benjamin conducted for all of these premiere seasons.

The libretto by Martin Crimp, who also wrote the libretto for Benjamin's first opera Into The Little Hill, is based on legend of the troubadour Guillaume de Cabestanh; the story is also repeated in The Decameron of Giovanni Boccaccio. The action takes place in 13th-century Provence.

The opera is divided into 15 scenes. The Protector (a rich land-owner) pays the Boy (an artist) to create and illustrate a manuscript about his family. The Boy and the Protector's wife Agnès are attracted to each other. Incensed by the reawakened independence of his wife, the Protector murders the Boy and forces Agnès unwittingly to eat his heart. Agnès commits suicide. 'Angels' comment throughout on the action from a modern-day perspective.

The success of the opera in performance motivated the Royal Opera to commission a second full-length opera by Crimp and Benjamin, Lessons in Love and Violence, premiered at the Royal Opera House in May 2018. The opera was given in several productions, such as the Oper Frankfurt in 2026, directed by Tatjana Gürbaca and conducted by Erik Nielsen, with Bo Skovhus as The Protector, Elizabeth Reiter as Agnès, and Iurii Iushkevich as First Angel/The Boy.

== Roles ==
Roles, voice types, premiere casts
Role	Voice type	Premiere cast, Aix-en-Provence 7 July 2012 Conductor: George Benjamin	Cast, Royal Opera House 16 March 2013 Conductor: George Benjamin	Cast, Deutsche Oper Berlin 30 January 2024 Conductor: Marc Albrecht
Agnès	soprano	Barbara Hannigan	Barbara Hannigan	Georgia Jarman
Protector	bass-baritone	Christopher Purves	Christopher Purves	Mark Stone
First Angel/Boy	countertenor	Bejun Mehta	Bejun Mehta	Aryeh Nussbaum Cohen
Second Angel/Marie	mezzo-soprano	Rebecca Jo Loeb	Victoria Simmonds	Anna Werle
Third Angel/John	tenor	Allan Clayton	Allan Clayton	Chance Jonas-O‘Toole
Angels, Archivists	Actors	Peter Hobday, Sarah Northgraves, Laura Harling, David Alexander	Peter Hobday, Sarah Northgraves, Laura Harling, David Alexander	Leander Gaul, Yasmina Giebeler, Mili Keil, Maximilian Reisinger

== Synopsis ==
Part I

- Scene 1: Chorus of Angels.

The chorus takes us back to 800 years ago, when books were "written on skin," and introduces the protagonists: the Protector (a wealthy landowner) "addicted to purity and violence" and Agnès, his wife, his "property." One of the angels transforms into the Boy, a manuscript illuminator.

- Scene 2: The Protector, Agnès and the Boy

The Protector asks the Boy to create a book celebrating his life, showing his enemies in Hell and his family in Paradise. The Boy shows the Protector a sample of his work. Agnès distrusts the Boy and is skeptical of the creation of images picturing their lives, but her objections are overruled by the Protector.

- Scene 3: Chorus of Angels

The Angels recall the brutality of the biblical story of Creation and its hostility toward women.

- Scene 4: Agnès and the Boy

Unknown to her husband, Agnès visits the Boy's workshop to see how a book is made. When the Boy shows a picture of Eve, Agnès laughs and challenges him to make an image of a real woman, one that he could want sexually.

- Scene 5: The Protector, John, and Marie

With the approach of winter, the Protector ruminates on Agnès's changed demeanor. She hardly talks or eats, turns her back on him, and pretends to sleep at night. Marie and John (Agnès's sister and brother-in-law) arrive for a visit. Marie is skeptical of the idea of writing a book and questions why the Boy is treated like a member of the family. This arouses the Protector's anger: he defends the Boy and his book, and threatens to forbid Marie and John from entering his property.

- Scene 6: Agnès and the Boy

That night, the Boy visits Agnès in her room alone and shows a picture of the kind she wished for. At first not recognizing it, she gradually realizes the painted image, of a woman on a bed, is of her. They look at the picture together and Agnès offers herself to the Boy.

Part II

- Scene 7: The Protector's bad dream

The Protector dreams that his people are rebelling against the book, and that there are rumors of a secret page where Agnès is shown gripping the Boy in bed.

- Scene 8: The Protector and Agnès

The Protector wakes up from the dream and reaches for Agnès, who is standing by the window watching the Protector's men burn villages. She asks her husband to touch and kiss her but he is disgusted by her request and says that it results from her childishness. Angered at being called a child, Agnès challenges her husband to go to the Boy and "ask him what I am."

- Scene 9: The Protector and the Boy

In the woods, the Protector confronts the Boy and asks who he is sleeping with and whether it's Agnès. Wanting to protect Agnès, the Boy lies and says he is sleeping with Marie. Satisfied, the Protector returns to the house and tells Agnès that the Boy is sleeping with "that whore your sister."

- Scene 10: Agnès and the Boy

Believing the Protector's story, Agnès accuses the Boy of betraying her, but the Boy explains he lied to protect her. Agnès says he was only protecting himself. She tells the Boy that if he really loved her, he would tell the truth and punish the Protector for treating Agnès like a child. She demands that the Boy create an image that will destroy the husband's smugness.

Part III

- Scene 11: The Protector, Agnès and the Boy

The Boy shows the Protector and Agnès some pages from the manuscript, including images of atrocities. The Protector asks to see images of Paradise, but the Boy responds that these images are Paradise and questions whether the Protector sees his own family and property in them. Agnès then asks to be shown the images of Hell. The Boy presents her with a page of writing, frustrating Agnès because, as a woman, she has never been taught how to read. The Boy leaves, leaving the Protector and Agnès with this "secret page."

- Scene 12: The Protector and Agnès

The Protector reads the "secret page." The Boy has written a detailed description of his relationship with Agnès. This makes the Protector furious, but satisfies Agnès because it shows the Boy did exactly what she wanted. Ignoring her husband's anger, she asks him to show her the word for love.

- Scene 13: Chorus of Angels and the Protector

The Angels describe the cruelty of a God who creates man with conflicting desires, making him "ashamed to be human." The Protector goes into the woods and murders the Boy.

- Scene 14: The Protector and Agnès

The Protector attempts to reassert control over Agnès. Sitting at a long table, she is forced to eat a meal to prove her obedience. The Protector repeatedly asks her how the food tastes and is infuriated by her response that it tastes good. He then reveals that she has eaten the Boy's heart. Agnès proclaims that no act of violence will remove the taste of the Boy's heart from her mouth.

- Scene 15: The Boy/Angel 1

The Boy reappears as the Angel and shows one more picture: Agnès, suspended in midair. The Protector had rushed at her with the intent of killing her, but before he could, she took her own life by jumping from the balcony. Three angels painted in the margin turn to the audience.

== Instrumentation ==
The piece is scored for the following orchestra:

Woodwinds

3 flutes (2nd doubling piccolo, 3rd doubling piccolo and alto flute)
2 oboes
2 clarinets
bass clarinet (doubling B-flat clarinet)
2 bassoons (2nd doubling contrabassoon)

Brass

4 horns
4 trumpets (1st doubling piccolo trumpet)
3 trombones
1 tuba

Percussion

4 percussionists (see below)
verrophone (ossia glass harmonica)

Strings

bass viola da gamba
harp

violins I (2 players doubling mandolins)
violins II
violas
cellos
double basses

The following instruments are shared among the 4 percussionists: glockenspiel, 2 crotales, steel drum, 3 tubular bells, 5 tuned cowbells (cencerros), vibraphone, gong, 2 small timpani, 6 mini-tablas, 3 bongos, 2 side drums, 2 tenor drums, tumba, bass drum, claves, 3 mokubios, 4 temple blocks, 4 sets of sleighbells, 3 pairs of maracas, 2 pairs of pebbles, guiro, whip, sandpaper blocks, typewriter, small triangle, untuned cowbell, 2 pairs of clash cymbals, 5 suspended cymbals, tam-tam

== Reception ==
One reviewer described the music for Written on Skin as "glistening, mysterious sounds" from the orchestra (which includes viola da gamba and glass harmonica) in "Benjamin's most vivid music to date, in a score embracing everything from sensuousness to explosive ferocity". In a 2019 poll by The Guardian, the opera was ranked the second-greatest classical composition of the 21st century, with Erica Jeal lauding the score as "tense, precise and often glowingly beautiful".

An audio recording from the Aix performances was issued by Nimbus in 2013.
