= Cologne Cathedral organs =

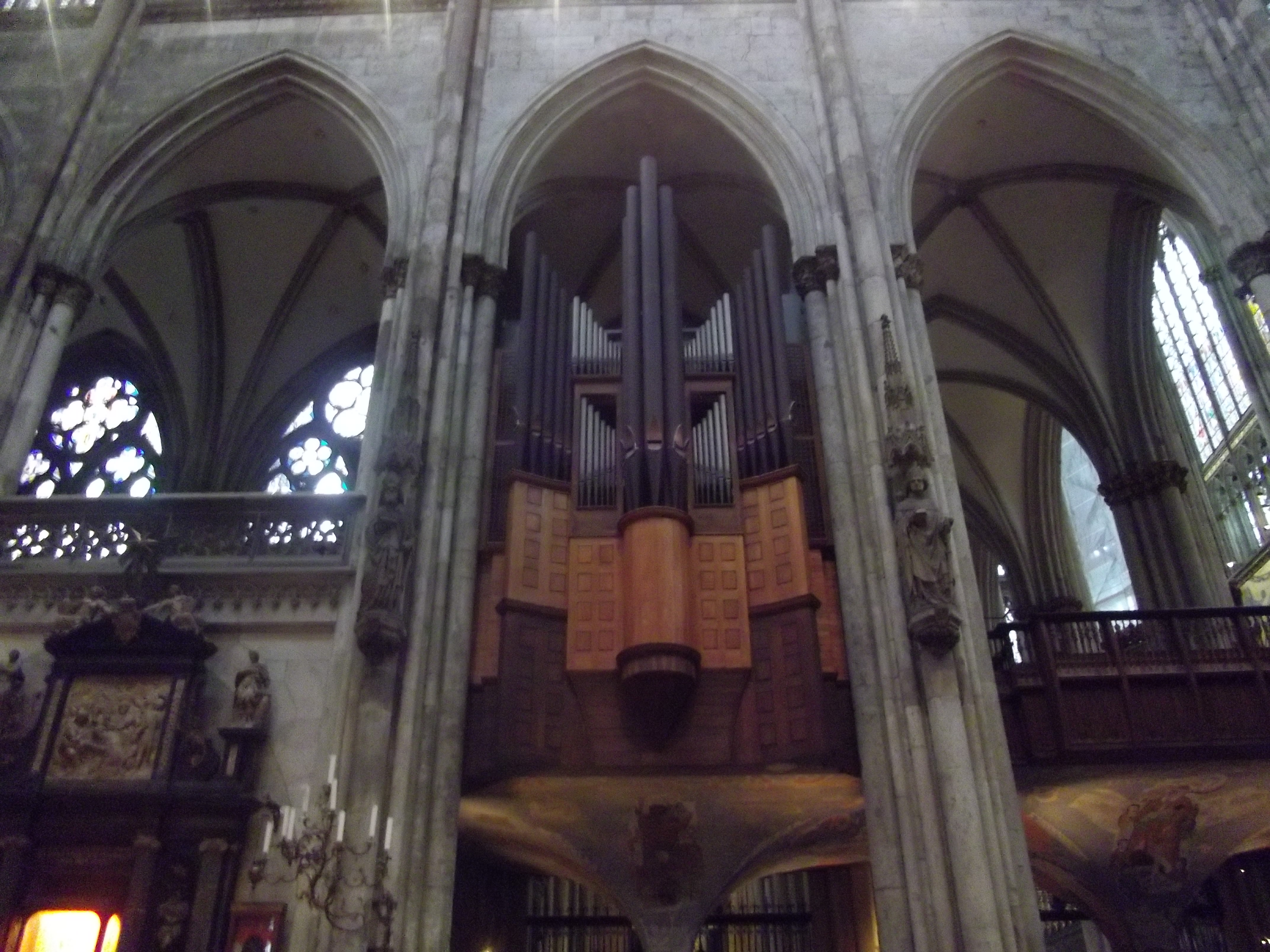
The transept Organ

The organs of Cologne Cathedral are the major source of instrumental music at the cathedral, being played for daily services and accompanying the choir, as well as being used for concerts and recitals.

The organists of Cologne Cathedral have included Josef Zimmermann, Clemens Ganz and Winfried Bönig. Since their inauguration by Professor Zimmermann in 1960, there has been a series of twelve concerts each year, on Tuesday evenings from June to September.

== Organs ==
The cathedral contains two Klais pipe organs built in 1948 and 1998.

=== Transept Organ (Klais 1948/1956) ===
I Positiv C–c4
Gedacktpommer	16′
Metallflöte	8′
Rohrflöte	8′
Salicet	8′
Principal	4′
Spitzflöte	4′
Nasard	2^{2}/_{3}′
Waldflöte	2′
Terz	1^{3}/_{5}′
Sifflöte	1^{1}/_{3}′
Mixtur IV-V	1^{1}/_{3}′
Dulcian	16′
Trompete	8′
Tremulant

I Rückpositiv C–c4
Portunalflöte	8′
Lieblich Gedackt	8
Blockflöte	4′
Superoctave	2′
Sesquialtera II	2^{2}/_{3}′
Scharff IV-VI	^{1}/_{2}′
Krummhorn	8′
Tremulant

II Hauptwerk C–c4
Principal	16′
Bordun	16′
Principal	8′
Octave	8′
Offenflöte	8′
Gedackt	8′
Gemshorn	8′
Rohrquinte	5^{1}/_{3}′
Octave	4′
Rohrflöte	4′
Terz	3^{1}/_{5}′
Septime	2^{2}/_{7}′
Superoctave	2′
Weitflöte	2′
Großmixtur IV	4′
Rauschpfeife III	2^{2}/_{3}′
Mixtur VI-VIII	2′
Trompete	16′
Trompete	8′
Kopftrompete	4′

III Schwellwerk C–c4
Großgedackt	16′
Principal	8′
Holzflöte	8′
Gamba	8′
Vox coelestis I-II	8′
Octave	4′
Querflöte	4′
Nasard	2^{2}/_{3}′
Schwegel	2′
Terz	1^{3}/_{5}′
Nachthorn	1′
Mixtur IV	2^{2}/_{3}′
Fagott	16′
Trompete	8′
Oboe	8′
Vox humana	8′
Trompete	4′
Tremulant

IV Solowerk C–c4
Metallflöte (Pos)	8′
Rohrflöte (Pos)	8′
Quintade	8′
Principal (Pos)	4′
Koppelflöte (Pos)	4′
Nasard (Pos)	2^{2}/_{3}′
Waldflöte	2′
Sifflöte (Pos)	1^{1}/_{3}′
Septime	1^{1}/_{7}′
None	^{8}/_{9}′
Nonenkornett IV	1^{3}/_{5}′
Mixtur IV-V (Pos)	1^{1}/_{3}′
Aliquot II-III	1′
Terzcymbel III-IV	^{1}/_{3}′
Dulcian (Pos)	16′
Trompete (Pos)	8′
Röhrenglocken
Cymbelstern
Tremulant

IV Hochdruckwerk C–c4
Konzertflöte	8′
Stentorgambe	8′
Tuba magna	16′
Tuba major	8′
Tuba mirabilis	8′
Tuba episcopalis	8′
Tuba capitularis	8′

Pedal C–g1
Vox Balenae	64′ (21^{1}/_{3}′)
from Principal 32′
Principalbass	32′
Untersatz	32′
Principalbass	16′
Contrabass	16′
Subbass	16′
Zartbass (SW)	16′
Octavbass	8′
Flötenbass	8′
Gedacktbass	8′
Choralbass	4′
Bassflöte	4′
Principal	2′
Hintersatz VI	2^{2}/_{3}′
Mixtur IV	1^{1}/_{3}′
Contraposaune	32′
Posaune	16′
Fagott (SW)	16′
Basstrompete	8′
Clarine	4′

=== Nave Organ (Klais 1998) ===
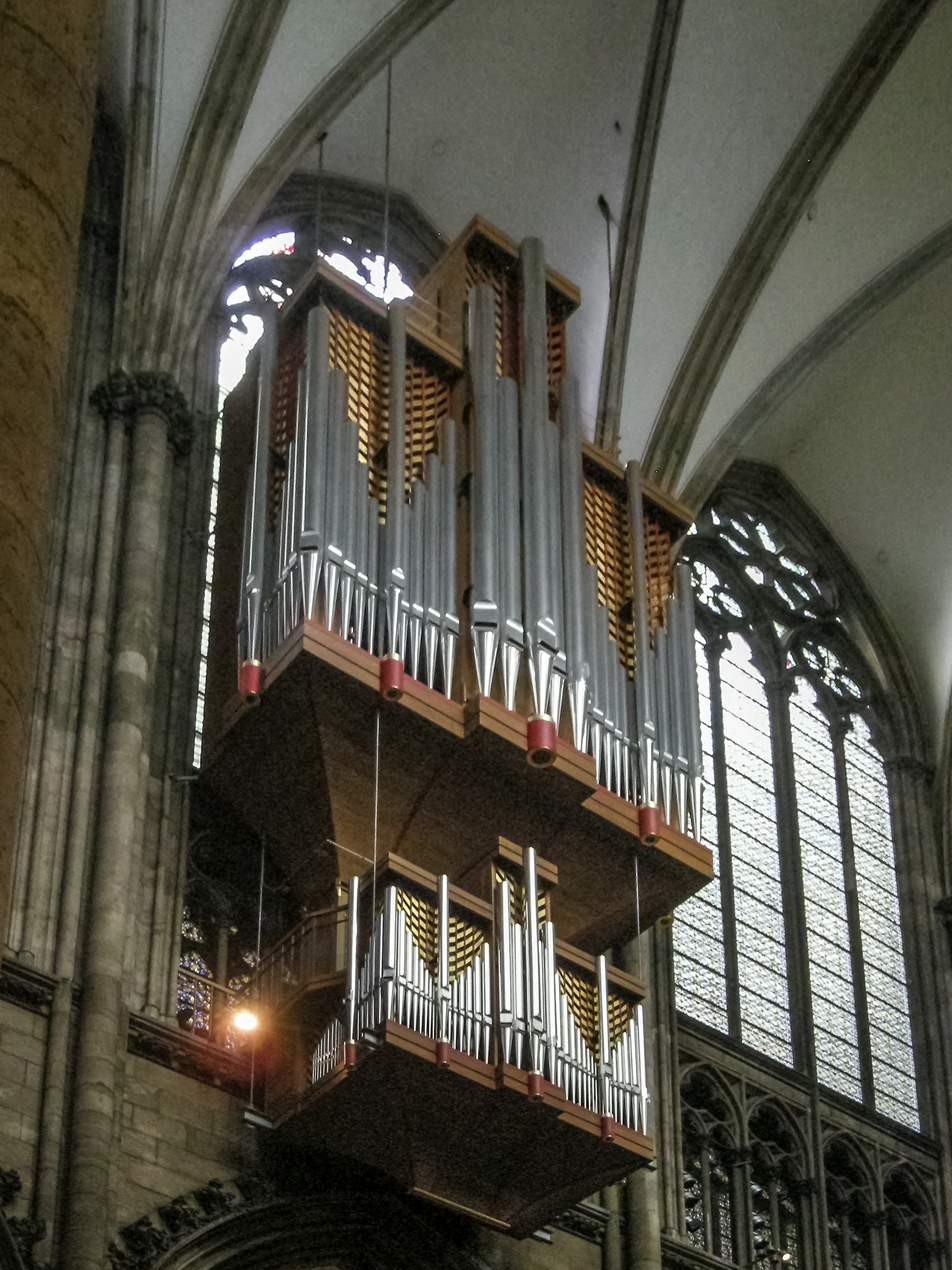
The nave organ

I Rückpositiv C–c^{4}
Bourdun	16′
Praestant	8′
Rohrflöte	8′
Salicional	8′
Principal	4′
Spitzflöte	4′
Nasard	2^{2}/_{3}′
Waldflöte	2′
Terz	1^{3}/_{5}′
Quinte	1^{1}/_{3}′
Scharff V	1′
Dulcian	16′
Cromhorn	8′
Vox Humana	8′
Tremulant

II Hauptwerk C–c^{4}
Praestant	16′
Principal	8′
Doppelflöte	8′
Gemshorn	8′
Octave	4′
Rohrflöte	4′
Quinte	2^{2}/_{3}′
Superoctave	2′
Mixtura Major IV	2′
Mixtura Minor IV	2^{2}/_{3}′
Cornet V (ab f^{0})	8
Trompete	16′
Trompete	8′
Trompete	4′

III Schwellwerk C–c^{4}
Salicet	16′
Principal	8′
Bordun	8′
Gambe	8′
Vox coelestis	8′
Octave	4′
Traversflöte	4′
Quintflöte	2^{2}/_{3}′
Flageolet	2′
Terzflöte	1^{3}/_{5}′
Mixtur IV	2′
Fagott	16′
Trompete	8′
Oboe	8′
Tremulant

Pedal C–g^{1}
Violon	32′
Principal	16′
Subbaß	16′
Quinte	10^{2}/_{3}′
Octave	8′
Bartpfeife	8′
Superoctave	4′
Flöte	4′
Posaune	16′
Trompete	8′
Clarine	4′

- Couplers: I/II, III/II, III/I, Sub III/III, Sub III/II, Super III/III, Super III/II, Super III/I, I/P, II/P, III/P.
