= Raymund Havenith =

German classical pianist

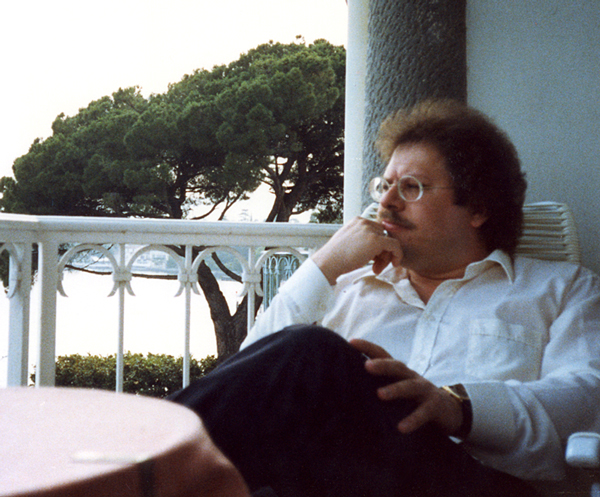
Raymund Havenith (1987)

Raymund Havenith (17 July 1947 – 15 July 1993) was a German classical pianist.

== Life ==
Raymund Havenith was born in Aachen into a family of musicians receiving his first lessons from his father Josef Havenith (1919–1978), a church musician and choirmaster.

He studied the piano with Günter Ludwig at the Hochschule für Musik Köln (Cologne University of Music). Still studying he won the Mendelssohn Prize in 1970 and graduated with the Piano Concerto No. 3 by Sergei Rachmaninoff in the same year. As a scholar of the Studienstiftung des deutschen Volkes he completed his musical education at the Conservatoire de Musique in Geneva. In 1970 Raymund Havenith participated in the "concerts by young artists" series organised by Deutscher Musikrat. In 1975 he made his début in London and two years later he made his first appearance in a festival concert at the Berliner Festspiele with the Berlin Philharmonic Orchestra. Subsequent concert tours have taken him to the Near and Far East including South-Korea and Taiwan and to the principal countries of Europe. Alongside his intensive activity in chamber music he did numerous radio and disc recordings. From 1986 until his death in 1993 he has been responsible for the piano Master Class at the Hochschule für Musik und Darstellende Kunst Frankfurt.

Raymund Havenith was married since 1980 to the Korean-German pianist Jimin Oh-Havenith, appearing together as a piano duo on stage. Their daughter Martha Nari Havenith was born in 1982.

== Selected discography ==
- César Franck: Prélude, Choral et Fugue, Op. 21 Köln, EMI 1976.
- Ludwig van Beethoven: Piano Sonata No. 22 in F major, Op. 54. Köln, EMI 1976.
- Modest Mussorgsky: Pictures at an Exhibition. EMI 1976.
- Peter I. Tschaikowsky: Grand Piano Sonata in G major, Op. 37. Köln, EMI 1978.
- Edvard Grieg: Ballade in G minor, Op. 24. Köln, EMI 1978.
- Louis Moreau Gottschalk: Early American piano music. Deutschlandfunk 1987, Musicaphon 1987.
- Johann Sebastian Bach: Goldberg Variations. Deutschlandfunk, Köln 1985, sound star-ton 1987 / 1991 (CD).
- Ulrich Leyendecker: Concerto for Piano and Orchestra (1981) Live concert recording, December 1, 1984, SFB-WDR, Wergo 1988.
- Ulrich Leyendecker: Works for Piano (with Jimin Oh-Havenith). NDR, Musicaphon 1990 / 1999 (CD).
- Edvard Grieg: Works for piano by Wolfgang Amadeus Mozart with additional accompaniment of a second piano Piano duo with Jimin Oh-Havenith. Hessischer Rundfunk, Frankfurt 1991, Musicaphon 1991, 2013.
