= Gereon Krahforst =

German composer, organist, pianist, harpsichordist, and church musician

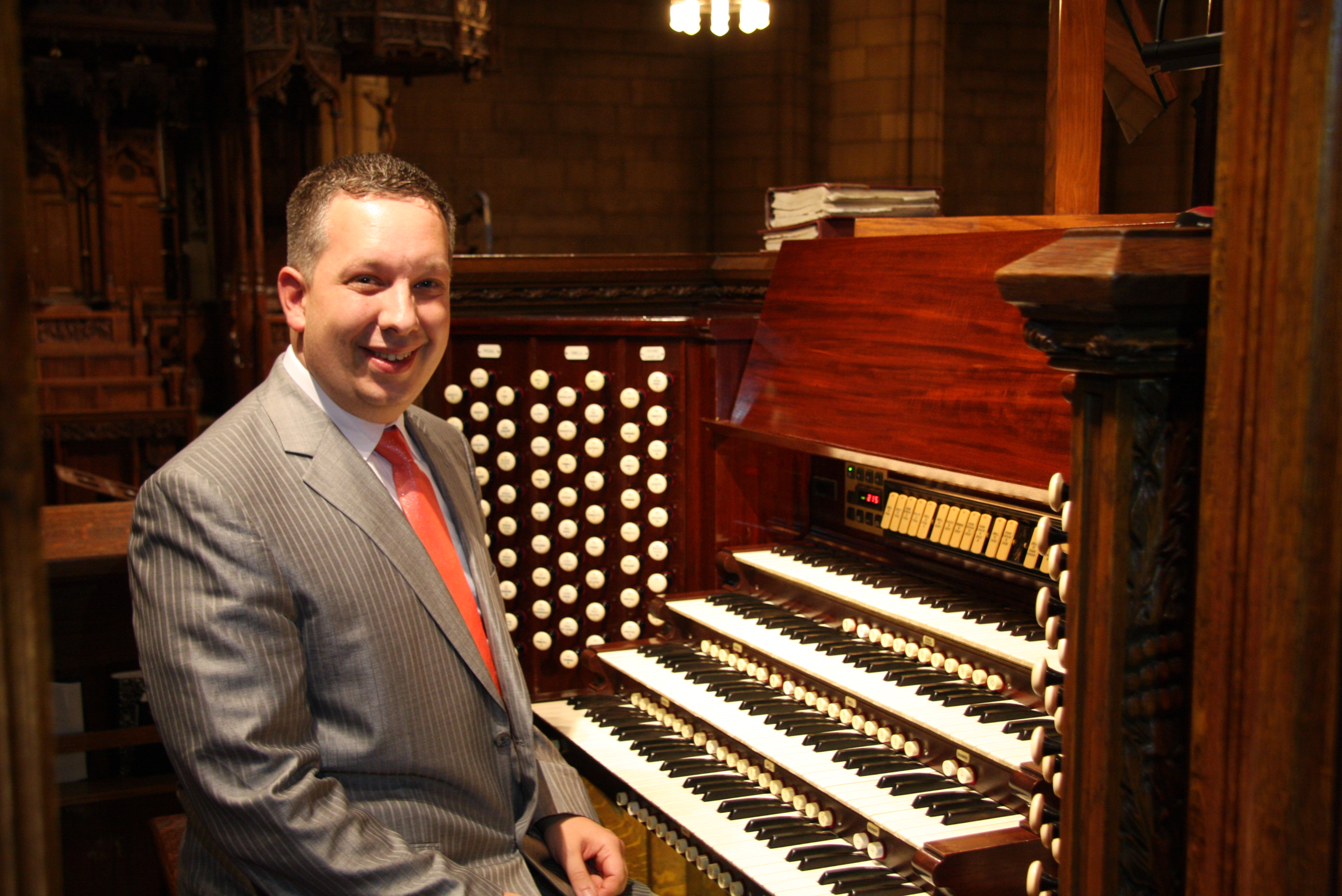
Gereon Krahforst at the organ of the St. Thomas Church, New York City, 5th Avenue

Gereon Krahforst (born 1973) is a German composer, concert organist, pianist, harpsichordist, and church musician.

== Training ==
Born in Bonn, Krahforst received his first piano lessons at the age of 5; his first organ teachers were John L. Birley (Himmerod Abbey) and Markus Karas from 1987/1990 (Bonn Minster). He studied composition during his school years from 1990 to 1993 (junior studies with Hans Werner Henze and Günter Fork), then after his Abitur (from 1993) composition, piano (instrumental pedagogy) and church music with Clemens Ganz, Henning Frederichs, Günter Ludwig, Johannes Schild and Phillip Langshaw at the Hochschule für Musik und Tanz Köln. He passed his A-Examen with a distinction for Organ Improvisation, after which he studied at the Hochschule für Musik und Darstellende Kunst Frankfurt am Main Organ (KA) with Daniel Roth. He complemented his training with master classes with Marie-Claire Alain, Tomasz Adam Nowak, Jon Laukvik, Wolfgang Seifen, Peter Planyavsky, Guy Bovet and Franz Lehrndorfer.

== Life and work ==
In 1985, at the age of 12, Krahforst became an organist at St Martin, Kirchsahr (Ahrweiler district); from 1989, he regularly played organ substitutes at Bonn Minster and St Josef, Bonn-Beuel. In 1993-1997, while studying church music, he often substituted for his organ professor Clemens Ganz at Cologne Cathedral; in 1998, he was briefly organist at St. Aposteln in Frankfurt. He received his first prestigious position in 1998 at the Kreuzbergkirche (Bonn), where he performed the complete organ works of Bach in 16 concerts in 2000. In 2000, he became organist and cantor at the Basilica of St Vitus, Mönchengladbach as well as the main parish church there St Mariä Himmelfahrt; there too he again recorded Bach's complete organ works. At the end of 2001, he moved to the Minden Cathedral as cathedral organist and choir director. In 2001, he also held a lectureship in organ improvisation at the Hochschule für Musik Detmold. In 2003, he was finally appointed cathedral organist at the Paderborn Cathedral. In 2004, he also took up a position as lecturer in organ and organ improvisation at the Hochschule für Musik, Theater und Medien Hannover. In 2011, he relocated to Marbella in Andalusia, as an organist at the Iglesia de la Encarnación - his family has had a second home there since 1987. In 2012, he moved to the US and became Cathedral Organist, Associate Director of Sacred Music, and artistic director of the International Organ Concert Series at the Cathedral Basilica of St. Louis (Missouri); there he taught several times for the American Guild of Organists. In 2014, he returned to Germany and first worked as a cantor at St. Lutwinus in Mettlach. In 2015, he finally returned to his old home by being appointed abbey organist and artistic director of the International Organ Concerts at the Maria Laach Abbey. Since January 2017, he has been a part-time committee member of the artistic planning group for the Organ Weeks Rheinland-Pfalz at the Ministry of Culture, Education and Research in Mainz, and since 2018 he has also been organist and custodian of the great organ at the Rhein-Mosel-Halle in Koblenz and artistic director of the Bonn Organ Festival; since 2019, he has been working, also part-time, as church musician in the Plaidt parish association, where, among other things, the valuable historic Keates organ of the parish church of St. Kastor in Andernach-Miesenheim is among his instruments.

In addition to the International Laach Organ Concerts and the Saturday organ matinées he founded, he is artistically in charge of the International Organ Weeks Rhineland-Palatinate and the organ concerts on the oldest playable organ in Rhineland-Palatinate in the former monastery church St. Leodegar in Niederehe, and in 2019, the "Music for Sunday" concerts he founded at the Basilica St. Severus in Boppard and another concert series in Boppard-Buchholz.

As a composer, he writes for various instrumentations, primarily for organ, piano, or choir; since around 2010, more and more commissioned compositions have reached him.

Krahforst's repertoire of organ music includes all the organ works of Bach, Buxtehude, Mendelssohn, Schumann, Liszt, Franck, Duruflé, Brahms Zachow, Couperin, the 8 organ sonatas and individual works by Guilmant, the 10 organ symphonies by Widor, all organ works by Vierne a large part of the organ works of Dupré, Langlais, Rheinberger and Reger as well as a large fund of standard works, little-known ones and works of the so-called early music and Romanticism alongside a large selection of English, American and Canadian organ literature.

His piano repertoire includes The Well-Tempered Clavier (Volumes I and II), the Italian concerto, the Goldberg Variations, the Inventions and Sinfonias, the 6 Partitas, the French Overture, the Toccatas as well as some individual works by Bach, the complete piano sonatas by Mozart as well as works by Haydn, Beethoven, Schubert, Schumann, Chopin, Liszt, Rachmaninofff, Scriabin, Ravel and Debussy.

As a harpsichordist he has worked intensively with the Fitzwilliam Virginal Book and the sonatas of Domenico Scarlatti. Krahforst also often appeared as a Lied accompanist. In his younger years, he created a song album with rock and pop songs for which he wrote the English lyrics himself and which even won a prize in a competition for light music; he also occasionally occupied himself with jazz piano music. He was allowed to record parts of his Zaubersee from 1991 for the radio station WDR 5 in 1993; further appearances on television and radio as well as CD recordings round off his wide-ranging activities. The Zaubersee, next to the Bilderbuch Andalusien, Krahforst's most personal work to date on the border between serious music and light music, will undergo a complete revision and digitalisation in 2020, after which a publication of the musical text is planned.

Concerts have taken Krahforst to almost every country in Europe, both in cathedrals (e.g. Notre-Dame de Paris, St. Thomas, New York City, St Paul's Cathedral, London, Kyungdung Church, Seoul) and churches, as well as in concert halls, from smaller concert series to renowned international festivals, and - also before his time in St. Louis - to the US, Canada, Israel, Korea, Japan and the Russian Federation. Already in 2007, he received the highest commendations and recognition from the American Guild of Organists for his Reger interpretations and his improvisation lessons. Krahforst is the dedicatee of various contemporary compositions from Germany, Belgium, Israel, and the US. He is a member of the Rotary-Club and the American Guild of Organists.

== Family ==
- Krahforst is a grandson of the musicologist Joseph Schmidt-Görg.
- He is also a great-nephew of the painter Hermann Krahforst.
- He is also a nephew of the musicologist Hans Schmidt.

== Compositions ==
- Concerto for piano and orchestra in B minor op. 1 (1987) (1st prize "Jugend komponiert" 1988 NRW competition).
- Piano Sonata No. 1 in D minor op. 2 (1988/1995/2020)
- 24 Préludes for piano op. 3 (1996)
- String Quartet in E minor op. 4 (1989)
- Sonata in G major for violin and piano op. 5 (1989)
- Sonata in F minor for violoncello and piano op. 6 (1989)
- Piano Sonata No. 2 in E minor op. 7 (1990)
- 8 Organ Pieces op. 8b (1989)
- Piano Sonata No. 3 in C minor op. 9 (1990)
- Symphony in D major "Eifelsomme for large orchestra" op. 10 (1990) (2nd prize "Jugend komponiert" 1990 NRW competition)
- "Der Zaubersee", a fantasy story with 36 piano pieces (1991) (1st prize "Jugend komponiert" 1992 NRW-Competition)
- Romantic Mass in E major for 4-piece SATB choir and organ op. 11 (1991-1995)
- Song of the Red Roses for piano (1992)
- Piano Sonata No. 4 in F-sharp minor op. 12 (1993)
- 3 Berlin Sketches after poems by Theophil Krajewski for high soprano voice and piano (1993/1994)
- Concertino for organ and string orchestra (1993)
- Variations and Fugue on the Bonn Minster Song "Cassius and Florentius" for organ (1993)
- First Organ Symphony (1993)
- Remembrance of a Dead Friend for clarinet and organ (1994)
- Der Rosenhag" after poems by Theophil Krajewski for high soprano voice and piano (1994-2002)
- Suite francaise for organ (1995)
- 2 Marienmotetten for 4-7-part. Choir a cappella (1995)
- Cologne Cathedral Mass for soprano solo, women's choir, organ and orchestra (1997)
- Organ arrangement of Andante con Variazioni G major KV 501 by Wolfgang Amadeus Mozart (1999)
- 24 Preludes and Fugues for organ (2001–03)
- Toccata Buxtehudina for organ (2001)
- 7 easy chorale preludes on Polish hymns for organ (2002)
- 5 Minnelieder for tenor and piano after Walther von der Vogelweide (2002)
- Missa puellarum for girls' choir and organ (2002)
- Cantata Mariana ad inaugurationem Arae Mindensis for SATB choir and organ (2002)
- Song motet "Nun danket alle Gott" 3 part mixed choir a capelle (SABar) (2002)
- Nocturne for organ (2002)
- Hommage à Flor Peeters for organ (2003)
- Missa in honorem Sancti Liborii for choir, brass ensemble, percussion and organ. First performed in 2004 in Paderborn Cathedral with more than 80 church choirs of the archdiocese conducted by Hartwig Diehl, the chamber choir at St. Josef, Siegen-Weidenau conducted by Franz-Josef Breuer, a wind ensemble and the composer at the organ.
- Trois Carillons pour Orgue (2004).
- Choral Partita "Wunderschön prächtige" for organ (2004)
- Four Advent chorale partitas on "Komm, Du Heiland aller Welt" (2005), "O Heiland, reiß' die Himmel auf" (2005, revised 2017), "Creator alme Siderum" (2005) and "Maria durch ein' Dornwald ging" (2005) for organ
- British Suite for Organ (2005).
- Two chorale preludes for organ in the style of Robert Schumann (2006).
- Theme, Variations, Fugue and Coda in the style of W. A. Mozart for organ(2006).
- Hommage à Jean Langlais for organ (2007)
- Seven sketches for trumpet and organ (2007)
- 10 chorale preludes on Marian hymns (2008)
- Variations on an Old Polish Dance for organ (2008)
- Organ arrangement of the "Variations sérieuses" op. 54 by Felix Mendelssohn Bartholdy (2009)
- Cheerful organ variations on the St. Nicholas song "Let us be merry and bright" (2009).
- The Seven O Antiphons for organ (one to seven voices) (2009)
- Fantasy on "Ave Maris Stella" for organ (2009)
- Piano piece on "I lost my heart in New York" (2010)
- 10 chorale preludes on Advent songs (2010)
- Variaciones sinfonicas sobre el canto de Alcala de los santos ninos para órgano (Symphonic variations on the church hymn of the "Holy Children" of Alcalá for organ) (2011)
- Variaciones sobre una canción japones para órgano (Light variations on a Japanese song for organ) (2012).
- Leonhard's Piano Album (Piano pieces in various styles) (2012).
- Seven Chorale Preludes on British and American Hymn Tunes (2012)
- American Trilogy for organ (2012)
- Organ arrangement of the second movement Largo ma non tanto from the Concerto in D minor for 2 violins and orchestra BWV 1043 by Johann Sebastian Bach (2012)
- Organ arrangement of the aria Meine Seele hört im Sehen by George Frideric Handel (2013)
- Seven chorale preludes with accompanying movements, published in the Organ Book of the Cathedral Organists (Bärenreiter)
- Ten chorale preludes with accompanying movements, published in the Ecumenical Organ Book (Bärenreiter) (2015, issued in 2018)
- Five Tunes for Organ (2020)
- Roots and Traces for Organ (Four pieces with stylistic metamorphoses) (2020)
- Beethoven-Jubiläumstoccata for Organ (2020)

== Recordings ==
- Glocken und Orgeln im Dom zu Minden. Liturgische Improvisationen zu den Kunstwerken des Domes und ihrer theologischen Aussage (an den drei Orgeln: Hauptorgel, Querhausorgel, Truhenorgel) sowie Geläutkombinationen. Axel-Gerhard-Kühl-Verlag (AGK) Haselbach
- Aus Liebe zur Heimat Vol. 1-3 Leichte bis mittelschwere Orgelmusik und Improvisationen an 8 Dorforgeln der Voreifel um die Stadt Rheinbach. (Christian und Theo Schmitz, Euskirchen)
- Orgelkonzert im Kölner Dom. Werke von Marcel Dupré (Offrande a la Vierge, Evocation), Couperin, Mozart, Rheinberger, Hessenberg, Lämmer Werner Mohr, Köln 2001
- Le Chemin de la Croix (Marcel Dupre) with texts by Paul Claudel (Recitation Propst Paul Jakobi), Dom zu Minden.
- Christus am Ölberg – Improvisations with two organists for the Year of the Bible on two organs. Gereon Krahforst and Matthias Mück, Magdeburg, organ; Paul Jakobi, recitation. Karl Adrion 2003
- Apocalypse - Improvisations with two organists for the Year of the Bible on two organs. Gereon Krahforst and Otto M. Krämer, Straelen, organ; Paul Jakobi, recitation. Karl Adrion 2003
- Improvisations on the Lukas Fischer organ of the main parish church of St. Mary's Assumption in Mönchengladbach.
- Johann Sebastian Bach: The Art of the Fugue BWV 1080 (arr. Helmut Walcha and Gereon Krahforst).
- Works by Johann Sebastian Bach - on the Schorn organ of the Parish Church of St. Nikolaus in Euskirchen-Kuchenheim
- Works by Johann Sebastian Bach (other than above) - on the Ott organ of the ev. church in Bad Münstereifel.
