= Timo Jouko Herrmann =

German composer

- Born: September 22, 1978 (age 47); Heidelberg, Germany
- Education: Hochschule für Musik und Darstellende Kunst Mannheim
- Occupations: composer, musicologist, conductor
- Notable work: see Compositions and Publications

Timo Jouko Herrmann (born September 22, 1978, in Heidelberg) is a German composer, musicologist and conductor.

== Biography ==
Herrmann studied composition with Ulrich Leyendecker and musicology with Hermann Jung at the Hochschule für Musik und Darstellende Kunst Mannheim. During his studies, he received further influence from composers like Hermann Schäfer, Krzysztof Meyer, Detlev Glanert, Roberto Doati and Wladimir Sagorzew.

Herrmann holds a PhD awarded for his thesis on Antonio Salieri and his German language stage works. His rediscovery of the lost song of joy Per la ricuperata salute di Ofelia K. 477a by Salieri, Mozart and Cornetti in late 2015 brought him world-wide attention. Among others, Herrmann created works for the Leipzig Gewandhaus Orchestra, the Leipzig armonia wind ensemble, the Heidelberg Symphony Orchestra and the Heidelberg Philharmonic Orchestra. Additionally, he received commissions from festivals like the Heidelberg Biennale for Contemporary Music, the SYLTARTFESTIVAL and the concert series for contemporary music kontrapunkte in Speyer. The Theater Heidelberg premiered several of his stage works, among them the chamber opera Unreine Tragödien und aussätzige Dramatiker and his contributions to the project Das neue Wunderhorn conducted by Cornelius Meister. Herrmann's chamber opera on Shakespeare's Hamlet, commissioned by the Opernhaus Dortmund, was premiered in February 2017 and performed with considerable success.

His compositions are published by Verlag Neue Musik Berlin and by Friedrich Hofmeister Musikverlag Leipzig. In addition to his profession as a composer, Herrmann also performs as a violinist and a conductor. He regularly works together with the pianist Martin Stadtfeld, the bass-baritone Falk Struckmann, the Mannheim Mozart Orchestra and the Heidelberg Symphony Orchestra as well as the Sinfonietta Leipzig. His albums Salieri - strictly private and Salieri & Beethoven in dialogue were each nominated for three Opus Klassik awards in 2020 and 2021. Since 2009 he has been art director of the classical music festival Walldorfer Musiktage in his hometown of Walldorf.

== Awards and scholarships (selection) ==
- Composition prize of SAP SE and the city of Walldorf (2001)
- Scholarship of the Wilhelm Müller Foundation Mannheim (2001)
- Composition competition Goethe vs. Schiller of the Goethe-Institut Heidelberg-Mannheim (2005)
- Gebrüder-Graun-Preis (2005)
- Finalist Berliner Opernpreis (2006)
- Scholarship Live Music Now (2006-2010)
- Junge-Ohren-Preis for Das Neue Wunderhorn (2007)
- Finalist Soli fan tutti at Hessischen Staatstheaters Darmstadt (2011)
- Commemorative plaque at the main portal of the monastery of St. Joaquín and Sta. Ana in Valladolid on occasion of the Spanish premiere of Per la ricuperata salute di Ofelia (2016)
- Honorary member of the Asociación Cultural Antonio Salieri (2016)

== Compositions (selection) ==
- Zeiten wie Perlenschnüre for mezzo-soprano, clarinet, horn, violin and violoncello (2001)
- Thränen in schwerer Kranckheit for soprano, English horn, violin and piano (2002)
- Andraitx - Pomegranate Flowers for baritone, piano, string quartet and double bass (2003/2010)
- Unreine Tragödien und aussätzige Dramatiker - Chamber opera after Anton Chekhov (2003/04)
- Mit Menschen- und mit Engelszungen for soprano, baritone, choir and orchestra (2004)
- Monolog des Leicester - Melodrama for two narrators, harpsichord, piano, violin, violoncello and percussion (2005)
- Schwanengesang - Dramatic etude in one act after Anton Chekhov (2006)
- Chiasmus & Oxymoron - Two rhetorical figures for orchestra (2007)
- L'ombre de Dinorah for bass clarinet and orchestra (2008)
- Morphine for soprano/alto saxophone and orchestra (2009)
- Skiatographie for saxophone quartet (2009)
- Jakobs Kampf am Jabbok for mezzo-soprano, violoncello and organ (2009/10)
- Sonatine for guitar and harp (2009/10)
- Tempus fugit for violin and violoncello (2010)
- Psalm 32 for baritone and piano quartet (2011)
- Narkissos - Mythological fantasy for orchestra (2012)
- Penthos for alto flute, violin, violoncello and piano (2013)
- Fabelhafte Welt - Five fables after Jean de La Fontaine for narrator, flute (alto flute/piccolo), English horn (oboe), bass clarinet (basset horn), violoncello and double bass (2014/15)
- Three pieces for bass clarinet (2014/2015/2016)
- ...sur un objet trouvé - Caprice No. 1 for viola and bass clarinet (2015)
- Nature morte - Stillleben mit Ginkgoblatt - Caprice No. 2 for viola and bass clarinet (2015)
- La lira d'Orfeo for guitar (2015/16)
- Concertino notturno for flute, horn and orchestra (2016)
- Hamlet - Sein oder Nichtsein - Chamber opera on a libretto by André Meyer and Kirstin Howein after William Shakespeare (2016)
- Five Intermèdes for Roland Dubillard's play Madame fait ce qu'elle dit for double bass and piano (2017)
- Fama for narrator and orchestra on a passage of Ovid's Metamorphoses (2018)
- Song of the Earth for narrator/tenor, flute, bass clarinet, verrophone and strings on a poem by Kurt Klein, late husband of Gerda Weissmann Klein (2021)

== Publications (selection) ==
- Sonatine for guitar and harp (Cantate Musicaphon)
- Sonatine for guitar and harp (Verlag Neue Musik)
- Three miniatures for three guitars (Verlag Neue Musik)
- La lira d'Orfeo for guitar (Cantate Musicaphon)
- La lira d'Orfeo for guitar (Verlag Neue Musik)
- Three pieces for bass clarinet (Friedrich Hofmeister Musikverlag)
- Andraitx - Pomegranate Flowers (Darling Publications)
- Five Intermèdes for double bass and piano (Farelive)
- Per la ricuperata salute di Ofelia - First edition (Friedrich Hofmeister Musikverlag)
- Antonio Salieri und seine deutschsprachigen Werke für das Musiktheater (Friedrich Hofmeister Musikverlag)
- Antonio Salieri - Eine Biografie (Morio Verlag)
- Salieri - strictly private (Hänssler Classic)
- Salieri & Beethoven in Dialogue (Hänssler Classic)
