= Verrophone =

Musical Instrument

A verrophone ("glass-euphonium") is a musical instrument, invented in 1983 by Sascha Reckert, which, "uses tuned glass tubes," open at one end and arranged in various sizes (usually in a chromatic scale, arranged from large to small, like the pipes of a pipe organ). The sound is made by rubbing one end of one or more of the glass tubes, or also by striking them or rubbing them with a special mallet. The tubes are close together so that chords can be played by rubbing more than one at the same time. The instrument carries more acoustical volume than the glass harmonica and some other glass instruments and generally has a range from G3 to F6 (which can be extended in the higher register with wine glasses, giving it a range up to D7). Every piece composed originally for glass harmonica can be played on the verrophone.

== Predecessors ==
The term verrophone originally referred to a glass harp. Previous glass instruments include the glass harmonica and arrangements of ordinary drinking glasses (approximately glass tubes closed at one end). The verrophone is capable of louder dynamics than the glass harp due to its larger radiating surfaces.

== Related instruments ==
Modern artists such as Barry Prophet of the Music Gallery have produced glass instruments that work similarly to a glockenspiel or lithophone, i.e. by striking various glass tubes. An example can be heard in a work entitled "Crystal Bones" composed and played on Prophet's microtonally tuned glass instruments.

== Notable players ==
- Friedrich Heinrich Kern
- Philipp Alexander Marguerre
- Sascha Reckert
- Sebastian Reckert
