= Udo Schneberger =

German pianist, organist and academic teacher

Udo Schneberger (born 28 January 1964 in Bad Sobernheim) is a German pianist, organist and academic teacher.

After first piano lessons with Rudolf Desch and organ studies with Dieter Wellmann Schneberger studied piano at the Musikhochschule Köln (piano Günter Ludwig/chamber music Amadeus Quartet) and church music at the Hochschule für Kirchenmusik in Heidelberg of the Evangelische Landeskirche in Baden (organ Andreas Schröder and Wolfgang Herbst/conducting Bernd Stegmann/Improvisation Renate Zimmermann). Participation in master classes and teaching events by Tatiana Nikolayeva, William Pleeth, Jürgen Uhde, Igor Ozim, Walter Nothaas complemented his artistic training.

Schneberger initiated the Mattheiser Summer Academy in 1988 on the occasion of the 250th anniversary of the Johann Michael Stumm organ in Bad Sobernheim.

Schneberger was appointed professor at Mukogawa Women's University in Nishinomiya and has taught in Japan since 1991. After working as a professor at the Shirasagi Academy of Music in Himeji and as a lecturer at the University of Arts in Osaka in Japan, he follows a master's programme in theology at Kobe Lutheran Theological Seminary in preparation for the doctorate.
