= Per la ricuperata salute di Ofelia =

Cantata by Antonio Salieri and Wolfgang Amadeus Mozart

- Solo cantata by Salieri, Mozart and Cornetti
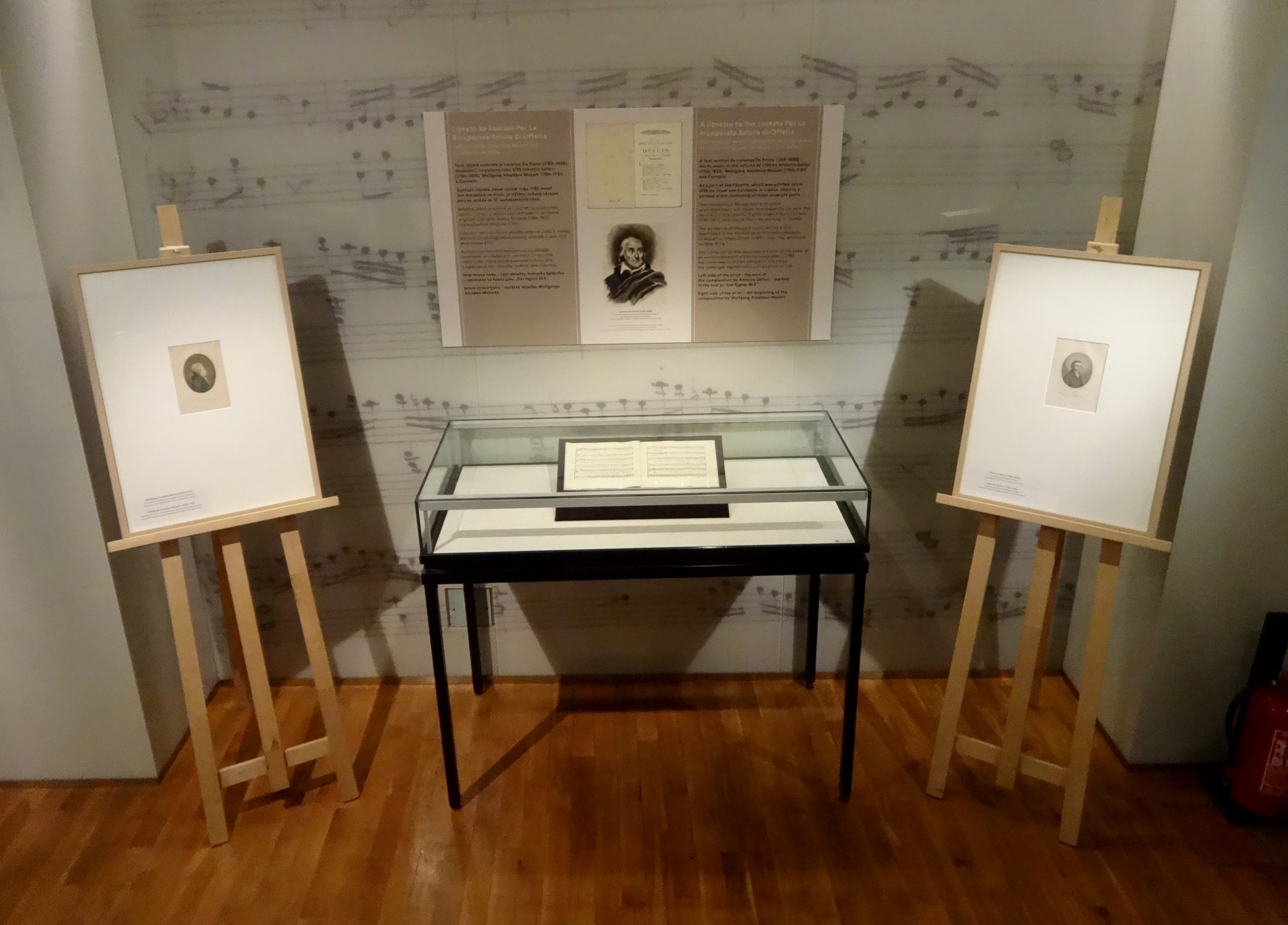
- Display of the score, which was believed lost, at the Czech Museum of Music in Prague (2016)
- English: For the recovered health of Ophelia
- Catalogue: K.^{6} 477a
- Text: Lorenzo Da Ponte
- Language: Italian
- Composed: 1785
- Scoring: soprano and fortepiano

Per la ricuperata salute di Ofelia (For the recovered health of Ophelia), K.^{6} 477a, is a solo cantata for soprano and fortepiano composed in 1785 by Antonio Salieri and Wolfgang Amadeus Mozart, and a third, unknown composer, Cornetti, to a libretto written by the Vienna court poet Lorenzo Da Ponte. It is speculated that "Cornetti" may refer to Alessandro Cornetti, a vocal teacher and composer active in Vienna at the time, or that it is a pseudonym of either Salieri or Stephen Storace, a composer who organized the collaborative work to honor his famous sister. The music had been considered lost until November 2015, when German musicologist and composer Timo Jouko Herrmann identified the score while searching for music by one of Salieri's ostensible pupils, Antonio Casimir Cartellieri, in the archives of the Czech Museum of Music in Prague.

== History ==
Conceived, written and composed to celebrate the newly recovered health of Nancy Storace, the Vienna-based, Anglo-Italian soprano destined to become the first Susanna of Figaro, and to welcome her back to the stage after a temporary loss of her singing voice owing to a nervous breakdown, the short work is compelling evidence of what may indeed have been an amicable and cooperative relationship between Salieri and Mozart. The brisk, four-minute cantata consists of three parts, each by a different composer.

Madame Storace was known for interpreting works by both Mozart and Salieri, as well as by her brother. Ofelia was a role that she was to sing in an opera by Salieri, La grotta di Trofonio, scheduled to premiere in June 1785, during the period she was unable to sing, and so the performance was postponed. Her recovery took three months. The cantata, composed in early Autumn, refers to Ofelia anticipating her performance. It is believed that Da Ponte and the composers wrote the cantata within a week, as Mme. Storace returned to the stage on September 19 in Giovanni Paisiello's opera Il Re Teodoro in Venezia – a performance the cantata clearly refers to in stanza 27 – and exactly a week later the cantata was announced in the local newspapers Das Wienerblättchen and Wiener Realzeitung, which advertised copies for sale by Viennese publisher Artaria & Co. The premiere of Salieri's new opera finally took place on October 12.

Mozart had a close professional relationship with the diva. The following year, before her return to her native England, he composed a farewell concert aria for Mme. Storace—"Ch'io mi scordi di te? ... Non temer, amato bene" (Will I forget you? ... Fear not, beloved), K. 505—and accompanied her as pianist.

== Discovery ==
Found amongst a bevy of confiscated property acquired during the 1950s and bearing the names of Mozart and Salieri "in a kind of signature code that was common at the time," according to Michal Lukeš, General Director of the Czech National Museum, the printed libretto reveals only the author's pseudonym, the year of publication, the printer's name (Joseph von Kurzböck) and the first letters of the surnames of the composers. As stated by the BBC, "its composers were identified in a code that has only recently been deciphered."

Ulrich Leisinger, Director of the Research Department at the International Mozarteum Foundation, has said:

We all know the picture drawn by the movie Amadeus. It is false. Salieri did not poison Mozart, but they both worked in Vienna and were competitors... Here we have a short, not great, piece by Mozart, but at least something that really sheds new light on his daily life as an opera composer in Vienna.

Of his discovery, Timo Jouko Herrmann has said:

The first part is by Salieri and is written in pastoral style. The second part is written by Mozart. It involves a more march-like rhythm—the beginning is reminiscent of his 1782 opera Die Entführung aus dem Serail. And the third part is by Cornetti. This is also written in more pastoral style, much closer to that written by Salieri." Moreover, Herrmann concurs that the work "shows a quite friendly outcome between the two composers.

As for the cantata's artistic merits, Alex Ross observed in The New Yorker,

...(T)he story behind the music...holds more interest than the music itself, which is uniformly dull. The past remains the past, and rarely generates headline news.

== Possible world premiere ==
It is unclear whether Per la ricuperata salute di Ofelia was ever performed in public prior to February 16, 2016, when harpsichordist Lukáš Vendl gave a solo performance, without a soprano, before an audience of several dozen listeners in a large hall of the Czech Museum of Music in Prague. The modern-day premiere with a soprano was performed on March 3, 2016, by Vinicius Kattah (fortepiano), Ute Groh (baroque cello) and Kate Rafferty (soprano) at the piano restoration workshop (Klavier-Atelier) of Gert Hecher in Vienna. Later the same day, the International Mozarteum Foundation presented the work at the Mozarts' residence, the Tanzmeisterhaus Salzburg, performed by Claire Elizabeth Craig (soprano) and Florian Birsak (fortepiano). The first performance at a concert directed to a general audience occurred in Canberra, Australia, on April 9, 2016, again with Australian soprano Kate Rafferty. The first performance in Spain occurred on September 1, 2016, in Valladolid following a conference moderated by Timo Jouko Herrmann. The concert featured Spanish conductor and musician Ernesto Monsalve (harpsichord) and Sara Rodríguez (soprano).

A recording of the piece was made by Irena Troupová (soprano) and Lukáš Vendl (harpsichord) and was broadcast on March 13, 2016, by the Czech Radio affiliate Vltava.

== Libretto ==
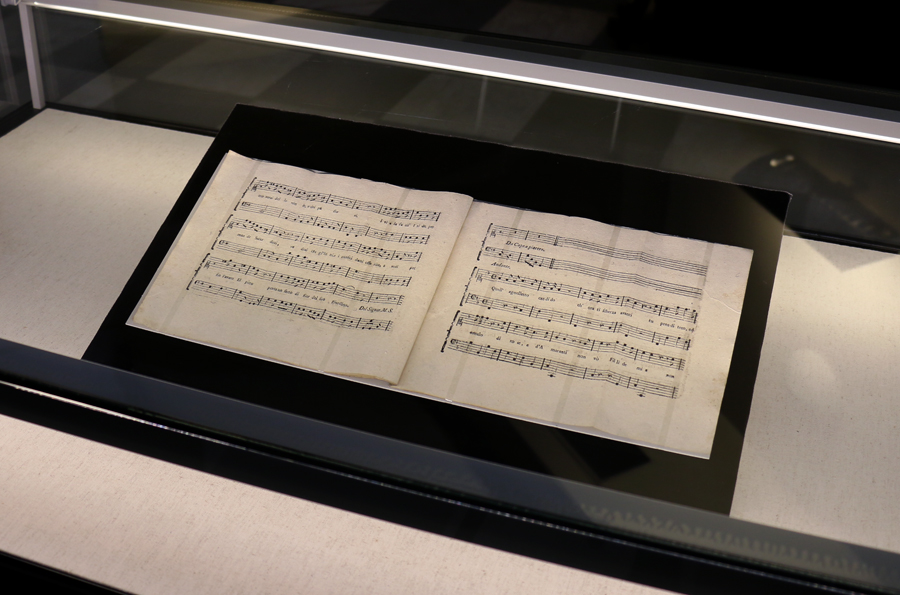
Obscure 1785 score, previously thought lost, discovered in the archives of the Czech Museum of Music in 2015

The first four stanzas (of 30) were set to music, the first two by Salieri, the third and fourth by Mozart, and again the first two by Cornetti. The asterisked footnote is Da Ponte's.

Canzone a Fille
Lascia la greggia, o Fillide,
La greggia a te sì cara;
Lascia le fonti, e i pascoli,
E vieni meco a l'ara,
Ivi adunati i cori
Troverai de le Ninfe, e dei Pastori.

Ivi a la facil' Iside,
Per man de' Sacerdoti,
Vedrai tra gl'Inni e i cantici
Doni offerire, e voti,
Perfin l'avaro Elpino
Porta un serto di fior del suo giardino.

Quell'agnelletto candido
Ch'ora ti scherza avanti
Tu prendi teco, ed ornalo
Di rose, e di amaranti,
Non vuò, Fillide mia,
Che fra tanti il tuo don l'ultimo sia.

Oggi la vaga Ofelia,
Onor di queste selve,
Quella cui vide Arcadia
Empier d'amor le belve,
Oggi fia che ritenti
Nel bel Tempio di Pan gli usati accenti.
