= Friedrich Heinrich Kern =

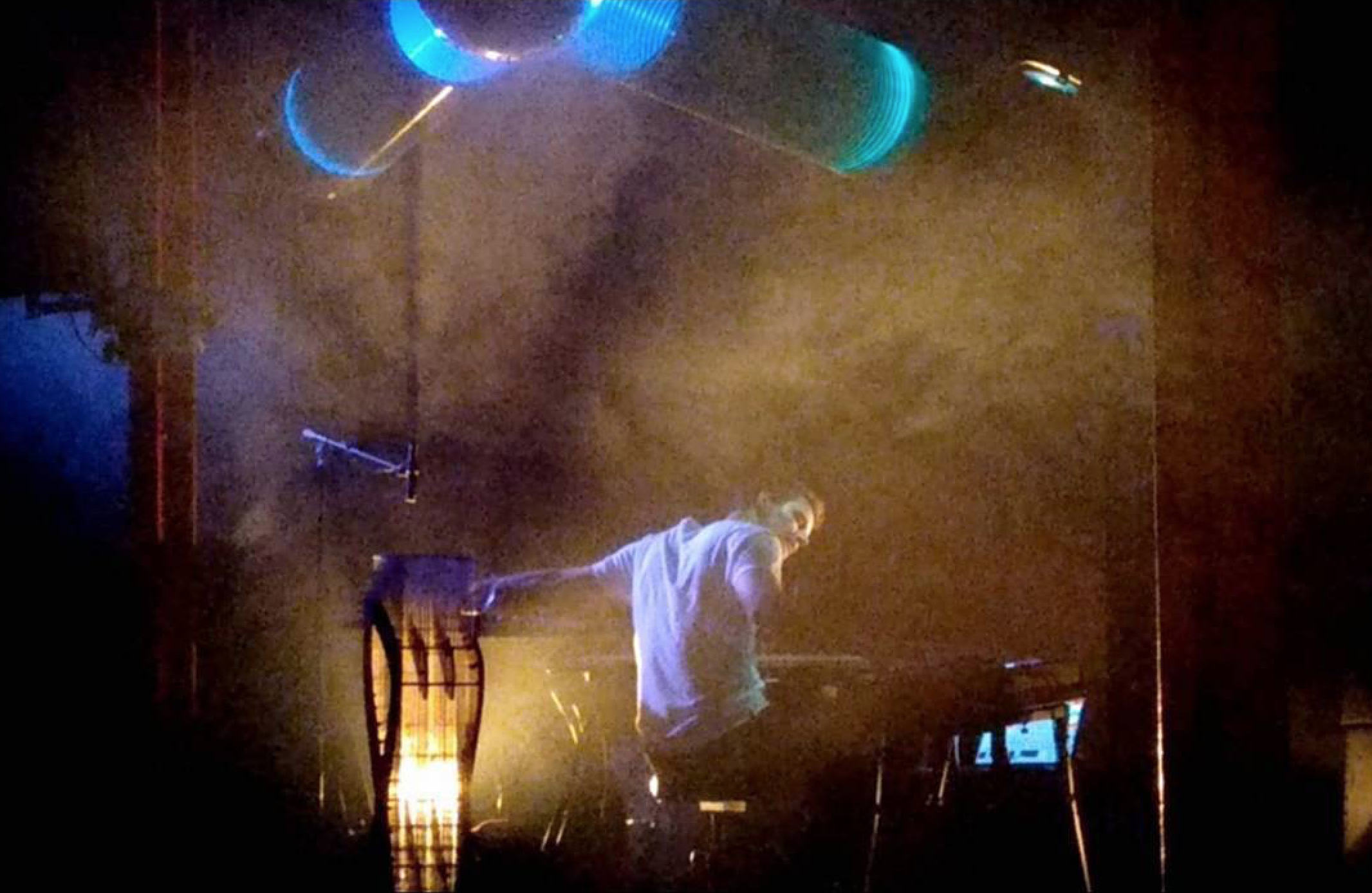
- Friedrich Heinrich Kern live in Leipzig, 2017
- Born: March 19, 1980 (age 46); Ludwigshafen, West Germany
- Education: Hochschule für Musik und Darstellende Kunst Mannheim, New York University
- Occupations: Musician; Pianist; Composer; Glass Harmonicist
- Years active: 1997–present
- Musical career
- Genres: Classical; Electronic; Experimental; Ambient
- Instruments: Piano; Glass Harmonica; Synthesizer
- Labels: M-MAXIMAL; Sony Classical
- Website: fhkern.com

Friedrich Heinrich Kern (born March 19, 1980) is a German composer, pianist, and glass harmonica player.

Kern began his studies at the Hochschule für Musik und Darstellende Kunst Mannheim where he graduated with a Diplom in Music Composition and Piano. His principal teachers included Ulrich Leyendecker and Rudolf Meister. Additionally, he spent one year studying traditional Korean music at Seoul National University. In 2007, he was a visiting composer at Wesleyan University. From 2008, Kern studied in New York with Matthias Pintscher and Louis Karchin. He received a MacCracken Research Fellowship and now teaches at New York University. Over the past 20 years, Kern has composed and produced hundreds of new compositions and dozens of new works. He has made lauded appearances as performer and composer in the United States, Europe, the Middle East and Asia. In addition to his work with electronic instruments and media, Kern has composed works for acoustic instrumentations, ranging from soloist to full orchestra. Friedrich Heinrich Kern published his dissertation, entitled An Exploration of Compositional Technique in the Operas of Kaaija Saariaho and Christian Jost, in 2016. He teaches a composition class at New York University, where he earned a PhD, and is based in New York City. Important works include Von Taufedern und Sternen for soprano and orchestra, premiered by the Baden-Baden Philharmonic Orchestra in Germany; "...pour une nuit seule", a string quartet written for the Jack Quartet, and Eins.Zwei for piano and percussion, premiered by the Either/Or Ensemble. His works are published by syncron-arts, Cecilia Music Concept, and Edition Impronta, his recordings are released by M=MAXIMAL and Sony Classical.

== Career ==
In 2011, Kern began to teach at New York University’s College of Arts & Science, and in 2017, he began to teach a composition class. It was there that he received his PhD in music theory and composition and was appointed director of the Washington Square Contemporary Music Society in 2016.

In 2014, Kern was appointed president of the League of Composers / International Society for Contemporary Music, the oldest organization for contemporary music in the United States, founded and based in New York City in 1923.

On July 24, 2018, Kern made his Mostly Mozart Festival debut with members of the Mostly Mozart Festival Orchestra. On July 25, 2018, Kern presented a late night recital, performing alongside pianist Emanuel Ax and Philipp Marguerre. Anthony Tommasini wrote in The New York Times that Kern showcased "the wonders of the modern glass harmonica" at that concert. Earlier that evening, the "splendid soloists" performed Mozart's Adagio & Rondo with two glass harmonicas and ensemble at David Geffen Hall for second evening in a row, an event critic Meche Kroop described as an "extraordinary state of shock, a pleasant shock." Kern also made guest appearances during this time, appearing on Niklas Liepe's 2018 album, "The New Paganini Project".

Kern premiered his arrangement of Mozart's Adagio and Rondo for glass harmonica, flute, oboe, viola and cello with leading members of the Metropolitan Opera Orchestra and the Calidore String Quartet in May 2019. He appeared with the same arrangement in Amsterdam in June 2019 with members of the Royal Concertgebouw Orchestra in a joint concert with Pierre-Laurent Aimard.

In January 2020, Kern performed the American premiere of Johann Friedrich Reichardt's "Rondeau for Glass Harmonica and Strings" with the Chamber Orchestra of Philadelphia. The Croatian National Theatre in Zagreb presented the first Croatian production of Gaetano Donizetti's original version of Lucia di Lammermoor with Glass Harmonica in February 2020, with Kern as soloist. His first performance in Paris on March 13, 2020, at the Cité de la Musique was held without audience due to the COVID-19 pandemic but was recorded for broadcast by Radio France. On March 25, 2023, Theater Kiel hosted the premier of a new ballet, "Flight of Fancy," choreographed by Wubkje Kuindersma, with Kern's music Reflections on a Dream for violin, glass harmonica and orchestra.

== Instruments ==
Kern performs on piano, electric piano, synthesizers, and electronics. He plays several glass instruments, primarily built in the workshop of Sascha Reckert. His preferred glass instrument is the verrophone, most recently used in his appearances with Opera Philadelphia, Shanghai Symphony, and the Metropolitan Opera.

== Works ==
=== Compositions ===
- Impromptu for piano (2002)
- Nachtschatten for piano (four hands) (2002)
- Rayon de Lumière for glass ensemble, percussion (2002)
- 5 Lieder for baritone, piano (2004)
- Keine Spuren...fixpunktlos for soprano, speaker, ensemble (2004)
- Walzer for violoncello, piano (2004)
- Anima for Korean Komungo, speaker system (2006)
- Essence for Korean kayageum quartet, Korean chamber ensemble (2006)
- Almost Romance for tuba, orchestra (2007)
- Anima II (Kern vs. Gould) for piano, speaker system (2007)
- Ellipses for violin, piano (2007)
- Fanfare - movimiento sin progresión for brass ensemble (2008)
- Eins Zwei for piano, percussion (2009)
- Les Adieux for 2 violins (2009)
- Solo for string quartet (2009)
- "...pour une seule nuit for string quartet (2010)
- Von Taufedern und Sternen for soprano, orchestra (2010)
- Von Taufedern und Sternen (Chamber Version) for soprano, ensemble (2010)
- American Dream for tape, ensemble (2011)
- Chamber Concerto for piano, strings (2011)
- Träumerei for percussion (2011)
- The Art of Right Living - Installation for voice, electronics (2012)
- Brise Marine for soprano, flute, harp (2012)
- Indigo for orchestra (2012)
- Wie ich for vocal ensemble (2012)
- Wir for chamber ensemble (2012)
- Les Adieux (Revisited) for 2 violins (2013)
- Winterreisen for ensemble, electronics (2014)
- Winterreisen (Extended Version) for ensemble, electronics (2015)
- either/or for violoncello, glass harmonica and piano (2018)
- Von Taufedern und Sternen (Revised Version) for soprano and large orchestra (2019)
- Reflections on a Dream for violin, glass harmonica and string orchestra (2020)
- Alone Together for bassoon, glass harmonica and electronics (2020)

=== Selected discography ===
==== Albums ====
- Electro Lyrixxx - Album with Pow!Boys (2003)
- Anatomy of a Dance - EP (M-MAXIMAL, 2019)
- Flow - EP (M-MAXIMAL, 2019)
- The Singles Collection, Beyond the Darkness - Album (M-MAXIMAL, 2020)

==== Singles ====
- Paganini’s Caprice #11 (Sony Classical, 2016)
- If You Get There Before I Do (M-MAXIMAL, 2017)
- Once Upon a Time, There Was You (M-MAXIMAL, 2017)
- Within (M-MAXIMAL, 2017)
- Behind the Wall (M-MAXIMAL, 2018)
- Consolation (M-MAXIMAL, 2018)
- Reflections on a Dream (Sony Classical, 2020)
- Glasraum (M-MAXIMAL, 2022)
- Mercy (M-MAXIMAL, 2022)
- Undone (M-MAXIMAL, 2022)

=== Arrangements ===
- Viva Verdi! for woodwind ensemble/harmonie (2003)
- Hänsel & Gretel for woodwind ensemble/harmonie (2008)
- Dornröschen for woodwind ensemble/harmonie (2009)
- Wellingtons Sieg for symphonic brass (2010)
- Paganini’s Caprice #11 for violin and orchestra (2016)
- Adagio & Rondo K.617 for verrophone and ensemble (2019)

=== Music for Dance ===
- KOM with Xin Ying, Principal Dancer Martha Graham Dance Company (Art Bath, 2022)

=== Music for Advertising and Media ===
- NW3 (London, 2010-2011)
- De Beers (London, 2010)
- Limited Edition (London, 2011)
- Hobbs London (London, 2011-2012)
- Maurizio Bavutti (New York, 2016)
- Invitation (London, 2012)
- Martha Stewart Living Omnimedia, Living Magazin (New York, 2013)
- MAC (New York, 2014)
- Christel MG Chaudet, Instagram (London, 2015)

=== Music for Film ===
- Schwarzes Glas for Babylon Berlin (Netflix/Sky, 2021)

=== Plays ===
- Was ist das Gute? Was ist das Böse? by Susanne Henneberger (WERKRAUM: Karlsruhe, 2019)

=== Books ===
- Kern, Friedrich Heinrich (2021). An Exploration of Compositional Technique in the Operas of Kaija Saariaho and Christian Jost. New York City: Friedrich Heinrich Kern. ISBN 9780578805290.
