= Friedrich Höricke =

German pianist and organist

Friedrich Höricke (born 1963) is a German pianist and composer.

== Life ==
Born in Cologne, West Germany, Höricke played his first piano recital in Cologne at the age of eleven. At the age of thirteen he was already accepted as the youngest student in the master class of Günter Ludwig at the Hochschule für Musik Köln. At the same time he attended the Cologne Apostelgymnasium. At the age of 18 he won first prize at the Tomassoni Competition of the Cologne Academy of Music, as well as a prize at the Ferruccio Busoni International Piano Competition. Further training followed at the Curtis Institute of Music in Philadelphia, where he was taught by Jorge Bolet, Gary Graffman, Mieczysław Horszowski and Seymour Lipkin. First prize at the Philadelphia Young Artists Competition followed, as well as concert engagements in America, Asia, Western, Central and Eastern Europe. He subsequently released CDs, increasingly with his own compositions for piano, or for piano and orchestra.

In 1985, Höricke married the sexologist Shere Hite in New York City, where they lived together in a flat on 5th Avenue. Later Höricke and Hite moved to Germany, where they took a flat in Cologne. In 1999 the couple divorced. Höricke is currently married to Astrid von Platen-Höricke and has lived in Senzke in Brandenburg since 2004. From June 1, 2010 until November 2012 he was managing director of Ribbeck Castle.

== Style ==
As a composer and pianist, Höricke feels obliged to the tradition of the great composing piano virtuosos. He tries to take up their lines of tradition and integrates his own piano works as well as his own transcriptions of foreign works into his concert programmes. Thus his concert suite from the Stone Flower, Sergei Prokofiev's last ballet, can sometimes be heard. In 2004, his piano concerto was premiered at the Saint Petersburg Philharmonic.

Among other things, he is dedicated to the rediscovery of Ignaz Friedman.

== Recordings ==
- Die lustigen Weiber von Windsor – and others pieces by Otto Nicolai. Together with the Kartäuserkantorei Köln and the Kölner Rundfunkorchester, conductor Michail Jurowski. Delta Music, Frechen 1998. (Capriccio 10592)
- Love & Passion – Leidenschaftliche Klavierwerke mit Gedanken von Shere Hite. Kompositionen unter anderem von Liszt, Rachmaninoff, Gershwin, and Debussy. EastWest Records, Hamburg 1998. (Red Moon 3984-25 187-2)
- Friedrich Höricke spielt Beethoven – Sonata No. 28 A major and Sonata No. 30 E major and Variations and Fugue op. 35. Bella Musica, Bühl 1995. (Antes Edition BMCD 31.9038)
- Serge Rachmaninoff – Sonata Nr. 2, op. 36. Dabringhaus und Grimm, Detmold 1994. (MDG 611 0547-2)
