= Andreas Rothkopf =

German organist, pianist and music educator

Andreas Rothkopf (born 10 October 1955 in Dillingen, Saarland) is a German organist, pianist and music educator.

== Life ==
After his first piano lessons with his father, Rothkopf studied Catholic church music and music education with Robert Leonardy at the Hochschule für Musik Saar in Saarbrücken from 1972 to 1978 (piano) and Paul Schneider (organ). As a scholarship holder of the German National Academic Foundation, he studied at the Hochschule für Musik Köln (organ with Michael Schneider, piano with Günter Ludwig and conducting with Volker Wangenheim). Supplementary organ studies followed with Marie-Claire Alain.

In 1986, he received a professorship for organ at the Hochschule für Musik Saar in Saarbrücken.

Rothkopf's concert activities as an organist and pianist have taken him to numerous countries in Europe and Asia. He has also recorded organ works by Robert Schumann, Franz Liszt and Max Reger on CD.
