= Günter Ludwig =

German pianist (1930–2022)

Günter Ludwig (28 August 1930 – 11 January 2022) was a German pianist.

== Life and career ==
Born in Großkrotzenburg, Ludwig attended the Musisches Gymnasium Frankfurt. He then studied piano with August Leopolder and Marguerite Long and conducting with Kurt Thomas. He achieved his first successes by participating in international competitions, winning third prizes at the Ferruccio Busoni International Piano Competition in 1954 and 1955. During his tours through Europe, America and Asia, he played in orchestral concerts with conductors such as István Kertész, Georg Solti, Horst Stein and Günter Wand and in chamber music formations with performers such as Arthur Grumiaux, Nathan Milstein, János Starker, Henryk Szeryng and the Amadeus Quartet.

Ludwig was professor of piano at the Hochschule für Musik und Tanz Köln and visiting professor at Indiana University Bloomington. His master students include Ulrich Windfuhr, Udo Schneberger, Alfredo Perl, Sung-Hee Kim-Wüst, Friedrich Höricke, Raymund Havenith, Ulrich Leyendecker, Gereon Krahforst, Andreas Rothkopf, Florian Wiek, Johannes Cernota and Franz-Josef Birk.

Ludwig was a freelancer for Schott-Verlag and Wiener Urtext Edition and a member of several juries of international competitions such as Bolzano and Genève.

Ludwig was married to the Korean singer Mi-Sun Choi-Ludwig and father of two sons. He performed with his wife as a Lied accompanist and with his sons as "Trio Ludwig". Ludwig died on 11 January 2022, at the age of 91.

== Cologne Piano Trio ==
Together with Walter Schreiber (violin) and Joanna Sachryn (cello), Ludwig formed the "Kölner Klaviertrio" in the late 1980s, founded by Walter Schreiber in 1983. The ensemble has made guest appearances in several European countries, Brazil, Japan and Korea and has played at international music festivals such as the Festival van Vlaanderen, the Carinthischer Sommer and the Berliner Festspiele. Contemporary composers such as Dieter Salbert and Violeta Dinescu have dedicated works to the Cologne Piano Trio, and since 2003, there has been a collaboration with the Polish composer and pianist Krzysztof Meyer.

== Recordings ==
Ludwig recorded piano music by Beethoven, Mozart, Brahms, Busoni, Schubert and Schumann, among others. Among them are all the piano trios by Mozart and Beethoven and the duo sonatas by Beethoven, Brahms and Busoni. With the violinist Alois Kottmann, he recorded violin sonatas by Max Reger and Robert Schumann. Together with the former 1st violinist of the Amadeus Quartet, Norbert Brainin, he recorded Beethoven's complete violin sonatas..

- Johannes Brahms: Piano Quartet in G minor op. 25. With the Slovenian String Trio. Colosseum, Nuremberg 1985.
- Max Reger: Sonata in D major op. 3 for violin and piano. With Alois Kottmann, violin. Cappella, Wiesbaden 1986.
- Robert Schumann: Sonata in A minor op. 105. With Alois Kottmann, violin. Cappella, Wiesbaden 1988.
- Robert Schumann: Sonata in D minor op. 121. With Alois Kottmann, violin. Cappella, Wiesbaden 1988.
- Franz Schubert: Sonata in C major. D 840. Arranged by Gunter Elsholz. Cappella, Wiesbaden 1993.
- Johannes Brahms: Sonata No. 2 in A major op. 100. With Alois Kottmann, violin. Cappella, Wiesbaden 1993.
- Robert Schumann: Kreisleriana op. 16. Cappella, Wiesbaden 1997.
- Johannes Brahms: The Sonatas for Violin and Piano. With Alois Kottmann, violin. Cappella, Wiesbaden 1998.
- Ludwig van Beethoven: Complete Violin Sonatas. 3 CDs. With Norbert Brainin, violin. Preiser, Vienna 2007.
- Robert Schumann: Sonata in D minor op. 121; Sonata in A minor op. 105; Clara Schumann: Three Romances op. 22. Performers: Collegium Instrumentale Alois Kottmann. Melisma 7101, Oestrich-Winkel.
- Johannes Brahms: Sonata No. 1 in G major, op. 78; Sonata No. 2 in A major, op. 100; Sonata No. 3 in D minor, op. 108. Performers: Collegium Instrumentale Alois Kottmann. Melisma 7102, Oestrich-Winkel.
- César Franck: Sonata in A major; Max Reger: Sonata No. 2 in D major op. 3. Performers: Collegium Instrumentale Alois Kottmann. Melisma 7018, Oestrich-Winkel.
- Ludwig van Beethoven: Piano Quartet No. 1 in E flat major WoO 36; Piano Quartet No. 2 in D major WoO 36; Piano Quartet No. 3 in C major WoO 36. Performers: Mannheim Piano Quartet. ZYX Classic, Merenberg.
