= Shere Hite =

American-German sexologist (1942–2020)

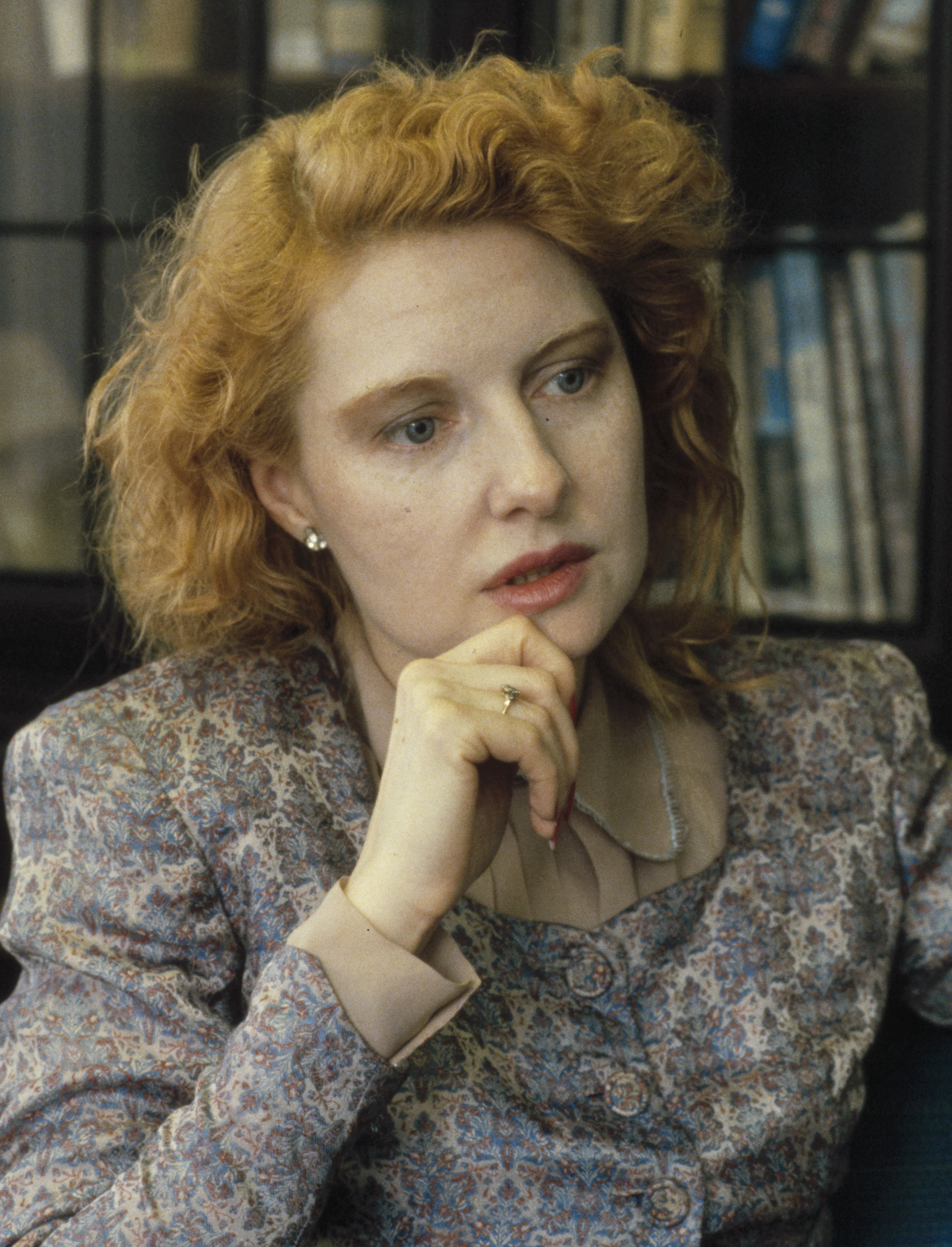
- Hite in 1981
- Born: Shirley Diana Gregory; November 2, 1942; St. Joseph, Missouri, U.S.
- Died: September 9, 2020 (aged 77); Tottenham, London, England
- Citizenship: United States (until 1995); Germany (from 1995)
- Education: University of Florida; Columbia University
- Known for: Research pertaining to female sexuality
- Spouses: Friedrich Höricke (m. 1985; div. 1999); Paul Sullivan (m. 2012)
- Scientific career
- Fields: Sexology

Shere Hite (/ˈʃɛər ˈhaɪt/ SHAIR HYTE; born Shirley Diana Gregory; November 2, 1942 – September 9, 2020) was an American-born German sex educator and feminist. Her sexological work focused primarily on female sexuality. Hite built upon biological studies of sex by Masters and Johnson and by Alfred Kinsey. She was the author of the groundbreaking The Hite Report: A Nationwide Study on Female Sexuality (1976), which became a bestseller. She also referenced theoretical, political and psychological works associated with the feminist movement of the 1970s, such as Anne Koedt's essay "The Myth of the Vaginal Orgasm". She renounced her United States citizenship in 1995 to become a German citizen.

== Early life, education, and career ==
Born Shirley Diana Gregory in St. Joseph, Missouri to Paul and Shirley Hurt Gregory. Shortly after the end of World War II, her parents divorced. When her mother remarried, she took the surname of her stepfather Raymond Hite. According to her friend Joanna Briscoe, Hite had never known her father, and had been abandoned twice by her mother at times because of mental problems. She did live briefly with her mother, stepfather (whose surname Hite she adopted) and baby brother. Her mother repeatedly lived in psychiatric facilities for much of the rest of her life.

Hite soon returned to her grandparents, who raised her until they divorced. They sent the girl to Florida to be raised by an aunt.

Hite graduated from Seabreeze High School in Daytona Beach, Florida. After she received a master's degree in history from the University of Florida in 1967, she moved to New York City and enrolled at Columbia University to work toward her Ph.D. in social history. Hite said that the reason for her not completing this degree was the conservative nature of Columbia at that time. She posed in the nude for Playboy magazine while studying at Columbia University.

In the 1970s, she did part of her research while at the National Organization for Women. Her most well-known work, The Hite Report: A Nationwide Study on Female Sexuality, was published in 1976 and became a bestseller.

Again using her technique of analyzing responses to questionnaires, she wrote and published two additional studies: The Hite Report on Male Sexuality (1981) and Women and Love (1987). In the midst of changing roles for women and men, these books made people "more uncomfortable" and brought strong criticism..

In 1988, she made an extended appearance on the British TV discussion programme After Dark, alongside James Dearden, Mary Whitehouse, Joan Wyndham, and Naim Attallah.

In 1989, she was interviewed in London by Joanna Briscoe, who later became her friend, and whose flat she often lived in.

Eighteen months later she left the United States permanently because of "vicious media attacks, doorstepping, public humiliation and death threats, all of which contributed to the loss of her American publishers and of her ability to make a living." Her fame, social tensions of the women's movement and poor economy had resulted in her becoming subject to resentment.

The Hite Report sold 50 million copies, and was estimated to be the 30th bestselling book of all time. While not as successful, her other books sold well, and she was frequently invited on TV talk shows and made other appearances.

According to Briscoe Hite commuted between Paris, the Kensington Hilton, and a mattress on the floor of a squat in north London. She swung between spending and thrift. Between 1991 and 1997, she lived largely in France and Briscoe's small flat. She tended to write all night and sleep all day. Briscoe said that Hite "had an extraordinary effect on people – possessing a strange, delicate charisma that hooked them".

Hite taught at Nihon University (Tokyo, Japan), Chongqing University in China, and Maimonides University in North Miami Beach, Florida.

== Research focus ==
Hite focused on understanding how individuals regard sexual experience and the meaning it holds for them. Hite believed that the ease with which women orgasm during masturbation contradicted traditional stereotypes about female sexuality. Hite's work concluded that 70% of women do not have orgasms through in-out, thrusting intercourse but are able to achieve orgasm easily by masturbation or other direct clitoral stimulation.

Hite, as well as Elisabeth Lloyd, criticized Masters and Johnson for uncritically incorporating cultural attitudes on sexual behavior into their research. For example, the argument that enough clitoral stimulation to achieve orgasm should be provided by thrusting during intercourse and the inference that the failure of this is a sign of female "sexual dysfunction." While not denying that both Kinsey and Masters and Johnson have played a crucial role in sex research, Hite believed that society must understand the cultural and personal construction of sexual experience to make the research relevant to sexual behavior outside the laboratory. She offered that limiting test subjects to "normal" women who report orgasming during coitus was basing research on the faulty assumption that having an orgasm during coitus was typical, something that her own research strongly refuted.

== Methodology ==
Hite used an individualistic research method. Thousands of responses from anonymous questionnaires were used as a framework to develop a discourse on human responses to gender and sexuality. Her conclusions were met with methodological criticism. The fact that her data were not probability samples raised concerns about whether the sample data could be generalized to relevant populations. As is common with surveys concerning sensitive subjects such as sexual behavior, the proportion of nonresponse is large. Thus the conclusions derived from the data may not represent the views of the population under study because of sampling bias due to nonresponse. Conversely, feminists have argued that previous studies on the topic were not representative of a general female population due in part to the means by which participants were selected. Many early subjects in the studies of Masters and Johnson, for example, were sex workers whose comfort with performing sex acts while observed in a laboratory setting might not have been representative of a less-practiced population. Hite's methodology attempted to minimize bias by shifting decisions of subject inclusion from researchers to subjects.

Hite was praised for her theoretical fruitfulness in sociological research. The suggestion of bias in some of Hite's studies is frequently used as a talking point in university courses where sampling methods are discussed, along with The Literary Digest poll of 1936. One discussion of sampling bias was done by Philip Zimbardo, who explained that women in Hite's study were given a survey about marriage satisfaction, where 98% reported dissatisfaction, and 75% reported having had extra-marital affairs, but where only 4% of women given the survey responded. Zimbardo argued that the women who had dissatisfaction may have been more motivated to respond than women who were satisfied, and her research may just have been "science-coded journalism." Some or all of her published surveys depended on wide multi-channel questionnaire distribution, opportunity for many long answers on a respondent's own schedule, enforced respondent anonymity, and response by mail rather than polling by telephone. Sharon Lohr argues that the distribution of questionnaires to women's organizations and the length of the questions and the allowance for long responses introduced a bias towards people who are not typical. She also argued that several of the questions led the respondent to reply in a particular way.

== Personal life ==
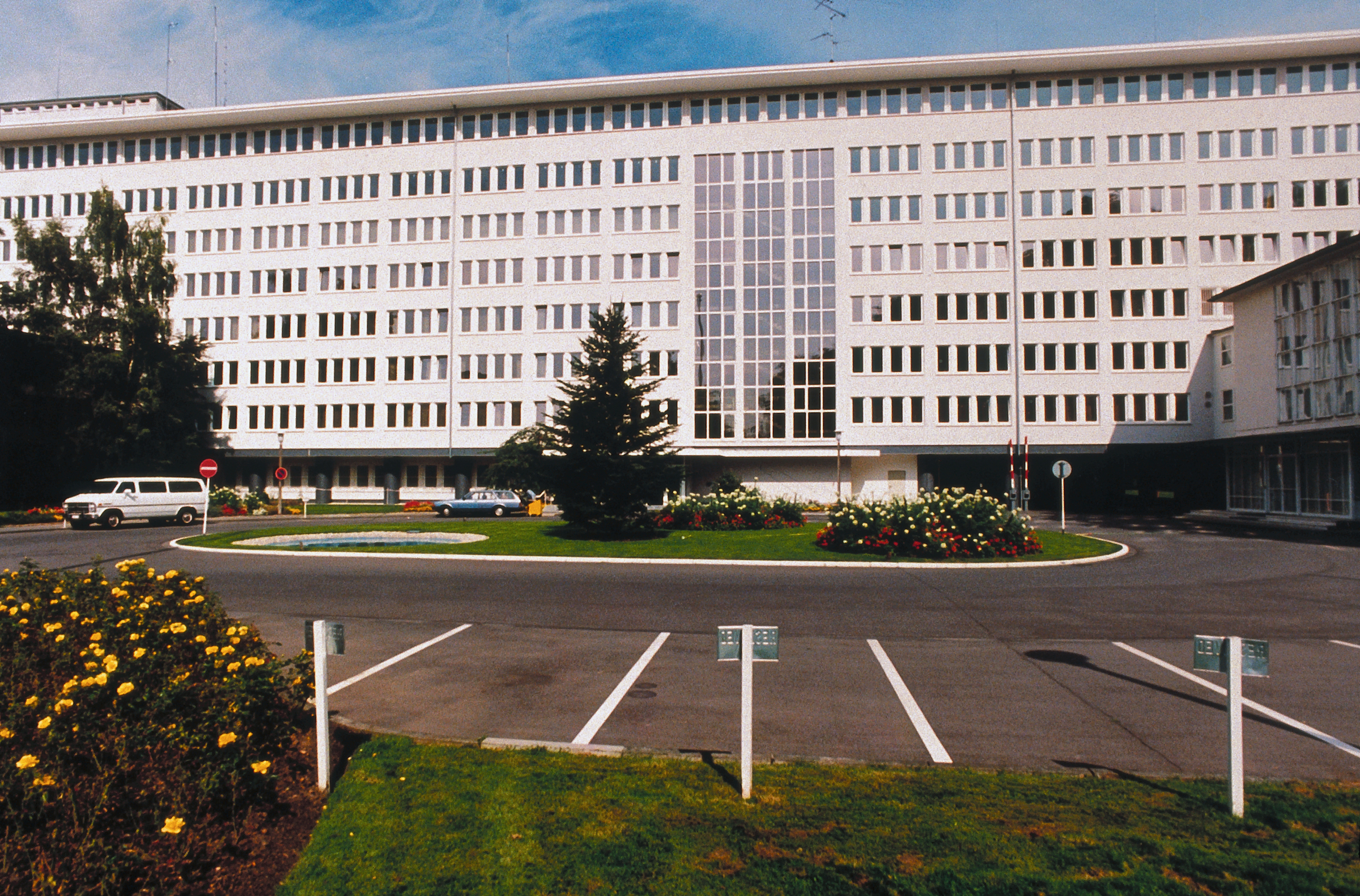
The former U.S. Embassy in Bonn, photographed in 1990, where Hite renounced her US citizenship and temporarily became stateless.

In 1985, Hite married German concert pianist Friedrich Höricke, who was 19 years her junior. After she joined him in Germany, the couple lived in Cologne. They divorced in 1999.

Hite married Paul Sullivan in 2012. They moved across Europe multiple times together, settling in north London, England.

In 1995, Hite renounced her U.S. citizenship at the former Embassy of the United States in Bonn. She wanted to become a German citizen because she regarded German society as more tolerant and open-minded toward her endeavors. At the time, Germany didn't accept dual citizenship, so she was forced to renounce her U.S. citizenship before becoming a German citizen. Because of this, she was stateless for two days before her German passport arrived.

In September 2020, Hite died of corticobasal degeneration at the age of 77.

== Legacy ==
The biographical documentary film The Disappearance of Shere Hite, directed by Nicole Newnham, had its premiere at the 2023 Sundance Film Festival, and was released in the U.S. in November 2023.

== Notable works ==
- Sexual Honesty, by Women, for Women (1974)
- The Hite Report on Female Sexuality (1976, 1981, republished in 2004)
- The Hite Report on Men and Male Sexuality (1981)
- Women and Love: A Cultural Revolution in Progress (The Hite Report on Love, Passion, and Emotional Violence) (1987)
- Fliegen mit Jupiter (English: Flying with Jupiter) (1993)
- The Divine Comedy of Ariadne and Jupiter (1994)
- The Hite Report on the Family: Growing Up Under Patriarchy (1994)
- The Hite Report on Shere Hite: Voice of a Daughter in Exile (2000, autobiography)
- The Shere Hite Reader: New and Selected Writings on Sex, Globalization and Private Life (2006)
