= Franz-Josef Birk =

German pianist and music producer

Franz-Josef Birk (born 1949) is a German classical pianist and music producer.

== Life ==
Born in Düsseldorf, Birk was admitted to the piano class of Bernhard Roderburg at the Robert Schumann Conservatory in his native town in 1961 after two years of private piano lessons. In 1963, he made his public debut with piano music by Béla Bartók and attracted the attention of the press with "his seventh sense for agogical nuance, a skill that is almost impossible to learn" (Rheinische Post). In the same year he won his first piano competition at the Jugend musiziert in Düsseldorf with piano music by Beethoven, which was followed by further prizes until 1965 in Essen, Marl and Munich with works by Bach, Beethoven, Chopin and Chatschaturian. Even in these young years, he played Mozart's Sonata in A major, KV 331, in the Solingen Stadthalle with "the kind of emotional forcefulness that no longer made Mozart feel like a classic, but rather welcomed him as a contemporary" (Solinger Tageblatt). In 1968, he continued his pianistic studies in master classes with Professors Günter Ludwig, Hansotto Schmidt and Alfons Kontarsky at the Hochschule für Musik und Tanz Köln.

After completing his pianistic studies, he played his first own three-part piano cycle with the main works of Robert Schumann in combination with works by other composers exclusively on Bösendorfers from 1976 to 1980 after a guest performance in 1974 in the series of Heinersdorff - Matinéen Düsseldorf and sparked enthusiastic reviews in the press, also because of the unfolding of the unique sound of the Viennese grand pianos. From 1980 to 1985, he took a break from public concertizing and devoted himself to music criticism for both the Westdeutsche Zeitung and the Rheinische Post.

In 1986, he returned to the concert podium with a twelve-part Beethoven cycle in Düsseldorf and at the same time inaugurated the series of Aton concerts, which to this day enables artists to perform in the state capital. In 1991, he performed in Baden-Baden in the final concert of an international concert series to inaugurate the then-new Steinway grand piano in the Kurhaus of Baden-Baden. After a piano recital in 1994 in the Bühlerhöhe castle concert series, he founded the "Fête Chopin" series there in 1995 - a concert form that presents Chopin's piano music and his literary environment in the interrelationships with other composers. The Badische Nachrichten wrote of a central musical event and reported on a phenomenal piano performance. In Düsseldorf and Vienna, this Chopin cycle is running simultaneously in the Bösendorfer Hall. Other stations of his performances so far have been Oberhausen, Essen, Berlin and Montreux-Vevey.

The pianist continued his Vienna Chopin cycle on 9 October 2009 in the Bösendorfer Hall with the theme: Chopin congratulates on 200 years of Mendelssohn-Bartholdy.

In 1994, together with the Düsseldorf sound engineer and filmmaker Ulrich Rydzewski, he began the production of a CD series, which for the first time presented top products of today's concert grand piano art to the public side by side. Recordings were made on concert grand pianos by Steinway & Sons, Bösendorfer, Blüthner and a first production of the S series by Yamaha, personally selected by the pianist.
