= Joanna Briscoe =

British writer

- Born: 1963 (age 62–63); London, England
- Education: University College London
- Occupations: Writer and journalist
- Writing career
- Language: English
- Genres: Novel, short story
- Notable awards: Betty Trask Award
- Website: joannabriscoe.com

Joanna Briscoe (born 1963) is an English writer who has written six novels and several short stories and has worked as a freelance journalist. Her first novel, Mothers and Other Lovers, won a Betty Trask Award in 1993, and her third, Sleep with Me (2005), was adapted for television.

== Early life ==
Born in London, Briscoe spent much of her childhood in the south-west of England. At the age of 10, she moved with her family from Somerset to Jordan Manor, an isolated, six-bedroom thatched Devon long house set within 10 acres (40,000 m^{2}) of land in a Dartmoor valley. She was rather isolated and she occupied her time reading and writing. Her works written as a teenager were rejected by publishers, but she was convinced she would be an author.

Briscoe's parents took her out of primary school at the age of ten and arranged for her to be home-schooled by an unqualified teacher at a nearby farm. Many of the lessons were out-of-doors on Dartmoor. At the age of 13 years, Briscoe returned to mainstream schooling at King Edward VI Community College, the local secondary school in Totnes, where she specialized in English in the sixth form.

== Career ==
Briscoe attended University College London, before working for several years as a freelance journalist.

In 1989, she interviewed Shere Hite; they became friends, and Hite lived largely between France and Briscoe's small flat from 1991 to 1997.

Her short stories have featured in several anthologies, and she has contributed widely to publications that include The Guardian, The Independent, The Observer, and The Sunday Times and broadcasting on BBC Radio 4. Her first novel, Mothers and Other Lovers (1994), in which a teenage girl tries to escape from a stultifying rural life, only to fall in love with her mother's new female friend, won a Betty Trask Award for first novelists under the age of 35.

Briscoe spent a lot of time in New York researching her second novel, Skin, a runner-up for the Encore Award. This explored the plastic surgery and psychological toll taken on women by the beauty industry. Briscoe's third novel, the psychological thriller Sleep With Me, published in July 2005, is according to author and critic Jonathan Coe "a beautifully written and emotionally candid novel which also happens to be a page-turner." It has been published in several languages and shortlisted for the Prince Maurice Award. Sleep With Me was adapted for ITV Drama by Andrew Davies and starred Adrian Lester, Jodhi May, and Anamaria Marinca. Her fourth novel, You, was published in July 2011, and after being selected as a Kindle "daily deal" on 2 December 2011, went to the top of the Amazon Kindle best-seller ranking for that day.

== Personal life ==
Briscoe lives in North London. She has two children.

In January 2024, Briscoe wrote about her relationship with late American feminist icon Shere Hite in the 1990s.

== Novels ==
- Mothers and Other Lovers (1994)
- Skin (1997)
- Sleep With Me (2005)
- You (2011)
- Touched (2014)
- The Seduction (2021)

== Awards and nominations ==
- Betty Trask Award (1995)
- Encore Award (shortlisted) (1998)
