= Ulrich Leyendecker =

German composer

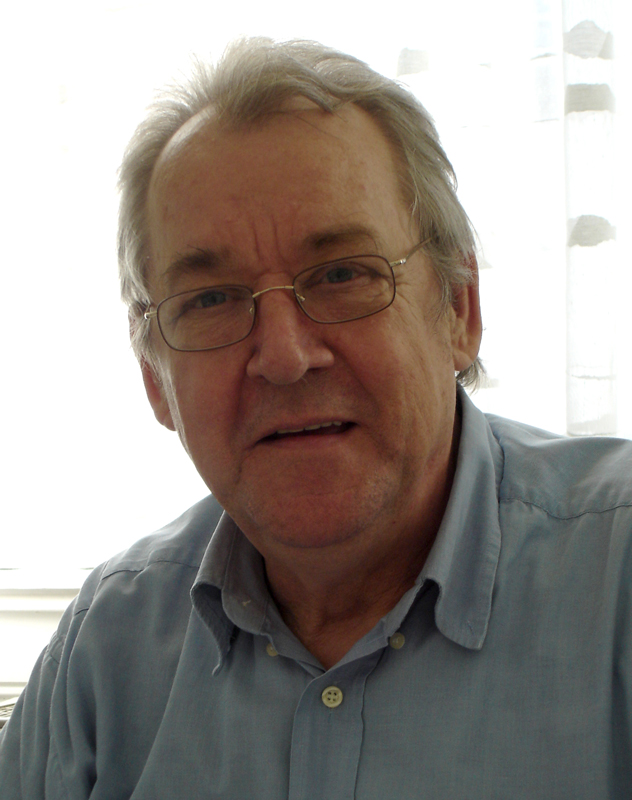

Ulrich Leyendecker (29 January 1946 – 29 November 2018) was a German composer of classical music. His output consisted mainly of symphonies, concertos, chamber and instrumental music.

== Life ==
Leyendecker studied composition with Ingo Schmitt (1962–1965) and Rudolf Petzold (1965–1970), and piano with Günter Ludwig. In 1971 he became a lecturer at the Hamburg Academy for Music and Performing Arts, and in 1976 he was appointed Professor of Composition and Theory at the Hamburg Music and Theatre Hochschule. In 1994, he became Professor of Composition at the State Hochschule for Music and the Performing Arts of Heidelberg-Mannheim.

== Music ==
Leyendecker's music, although not serial, is largely atonal, but often with subtle hints of tonality. He employed regular time signatures in his pieces, but it sometimes does not sound that way, for he utilized carefully calculated and complex rhythms. His music often contains novel sonic architectures, while still managing to express powerful emotions directly to the listener. He often employed classical abstract forms such as the symphony and concerto form while avoiding operas and ballets.

== Works ==
=== Orchestral ===
- Symphonies
  - Symphony No. 1 (1974)
  - Symphony No. 2 (1985)
  - Symphony No. 3 (1990-1)
  - Symphony No. 4 (1997)
  - Symphony No. 5 (Concerto for Orchestra) (2000)
- Con espressione (1979)
- Verwandlung, five pieces for chamber orchestra (1980)
- Impromptu (1981)
- Erinnerung, symphonic movement (1995)
- Penseés sur un Prélude, variations on a prelude by Debussy (2001)
- Evocation (2006)
- Mannheim Concerto (2006), for 2 chamber orchestras

=== Concertante ===
- Piano Concerto (1980)
- Cello Concerto (1983)
- Violin Concerto (1995)
- Guitar Concerto (2004–2005)
- Viola Concerto (2007–2008)

=== Vocal ===
- Two Chinese Songs, for soprano and piano (1964)
- Nocturne, for bass and orchestra (1968)
- Versunken in die Nacht, for soprano and chamber orchestra (1981)
- Canción última, for alto and chamber ensemble (1983)
- Nocturne, for soprano and four cellos (1987)
- Hebrew Ballads
  - version for mezzo-soprano, flute, clarinet, harp, viola, and double-bass (1993)
  - version for mezzo-soprano and piano (1993)
- Serenade
  - version for soprano, violin/viola, saxophone, and percussion (1997)
  - version for soprano, viola, bass clarinet, and piano (2001)

=== Chamber ===
- String Quartets
  - String Quartet No. 1 (1978)
  - String Quartet No. 2 (1987)
  - String Quartet No. 3 (1989)
- String Trios
  - String Trio No. 1 (1966)
  - String Trio No. 2 (1972)
- Trio for Clarinet, Cello and Piano (1964–1967)
- Trio for Viola, Bass Clarinet and Piano (1966, revised 2001)
- Maqam (1967), for violin, cello, and piano
- Sonata for Flute, Viola, and Harp (1988)
- Chamber Concerto (1989), for flute, clarinet, horn, violin, viola, cello, double bass, percussion and piano
- Quintet for Bass Clarinet and String Quartet (2000)
- Midnight Music (2008), for guitar and harp

=== Instrumental ===
- Clarinet Sonata (1966)
- Canto, for violin (1979)
- Verso Parsifal, for guitar (1982)
- Etüde, for viola (1989)
- Two Etudes for Bass Clarinet (1990)
- Three Nocturnes for Guitar (2014)

=== Piano ===
- Sonata for Two Pianos (1985)
- 13 Bagatelles (1989)
- Ricercar, for two pianos (1993)
- Impromptu, for two pianos (1994)

== Discography ==
- Violin Concerto, Symphony No. 3 (Naxos) – Recensions:(1), (2)
- Cello Concerto, Piano Concerto, String Quartett No. 1, Canto per Violino solo (Wergo)
- Piano Works (Cantate Musicaphon)
- Hebräische Balladen in Andere Welten – 50 Jahre Neue Musik in NRW – Ausstrahlungen (1996)
- Guitar Concerto, Evocazione, Symphony No. 4 (Cantate Musicaphon)
- String quartets No. 1-3, Quintet for bass clarinet and strings (Cantate Musicaphon)

== Notable students ==
- Timo Jouko Herrmann
- Friedrich Heinrich Kern
