= Clemens Ganz =

German organist (1935–2023)

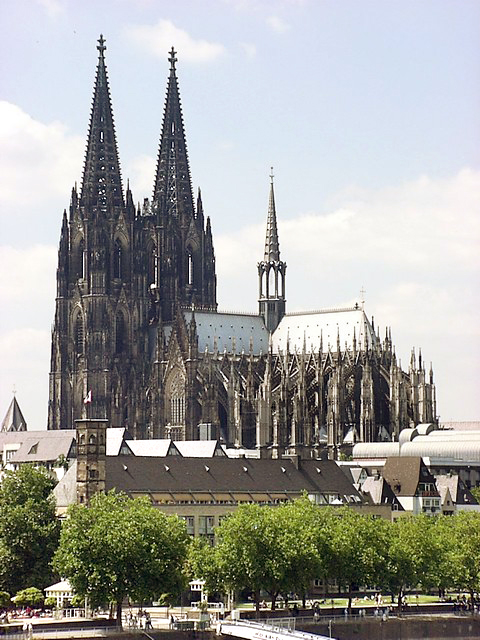
Cologne Cathedral

Clemens Ganz (18 January 1935 – 19 March 2023) was a German organist.

Ganz studied with Hermann Schroeder and Josef Zimmermann church music and school music at the Hochschule für Musik in Cologne (A-examination). From 1964 to 1976 he was cantor at St. Marien in Köln-Kalk. From 1971 to 1998 he taught as professor at the Hochschule für Musik. From 1985 to 2001 he was organist of Cologne Cathedral.

Ganz died on 19 March 2023, at the age of 88.

== Discography ==
- Hermann Schroeder: Sechs Orgelchoräle über altdeutsche geistliche Volkslieder op. 11
- Hermann Schroeder: Vier Choralvorspiele
- Die neue Schwalbennestorgel im Kölner Dom
- Die Klais-Orgeln im Kölner Dom
- Orgeln in Köln
- Musik am Hohen Dom zu Köln
- Freu dich Erd und Sternenzelt : festliche Advents- und Weihnachtsmusik
